= List of Albany suburbs =

This is a list of the suburbs and localities of Albany, Western Australia.

- Albany
- Bayonet Head
- Big Grove
- Centennial Park
- Collingwood Heights
- Collingwood Park
- Emu Point
- Frenchman Bay
- Gledhow
- Goode Beach
- Lange
- Little Grove
- Lockyer
- Lower King
- McKail
- Middleton Beach
- Milpara
- Mira Mar
- Mount Clarence
- Mount Elphinstone
- Mount Melville
- Orana
- Port Albany
- Redmond
- Robinson
- Rocky Crossing
- Sandpatch
- Spencer Park
- Seppings
- Torndirrup
- Vancouver Peninsula
- Walmsley
- Warrenup
- Willyung
- Yakamia
