= List of heritage places in the City of Albany =

List of heritage sites in Western Australia

The State Register of Heritage Places is maintained by the Heritage Council of Western Australia. As of 2026, 473 places are heritage-listed in the City of Albany, of which 94 are on the State Register of Heritage Places.

== List ==
As of 2026, following places are heritage listed in the City of Albany but are not State registered:

Place name	Place #	Street number	Street name	Suburb or town	Notes & former names	Photo
Independent Order of Oddfellows Hall	4	99-101	Aberdeen Street	Albany	Aberdeen House, Baptist Church & Hall (former)	
House	5	75	Albany Highway	Mount Melville	Professional Office	
House	6	81	Albany Highway	Mount Melville		
House	7	77	Albany Highway	Mount Melville		
House	8	85-87	Albany Highway	Mount Melville	Professional Office	
House	9	27	Albany Highway	Albany		
House	10	35	Albany Highway	Albany		
The Castle	11	10	Alexander Street	Centennial Park		
Albany Senior High School	12	61	Burt Street	Mount Clarence		
House	13	140	Burgoyne Road	Albany		
Masonic Hall	14	21	Burt Street	Albany		
House	15		Checker's Walk	Albany		
House	18		Cuddihy Avenue	Albany		
Earl of Spencer Inn	22	50-60	Earl Street	Albany	House and Shop, Nesbitt's Cash Store	
Streetscape	24		Festing Street	Albany		
Double-sided Fireplace	25		Fisherman's Cove	Albany	Barker Bay Whaling site	
Moir Warehouse (former)	27	61	Frederick Street	Albany	Royal George Liquor Store, Store & Granary	
Small Castle	33		Monk Lane	Albany		
House	35		Mount Street	Albany	Baesjou House	
Bangor House	36	36	Vancouver Street	Albany		
Stone House Wall	38		Parade & Grey Streets	Albany		
House	41	6	Robinson Street	Albany		
House	45	41	Serpentine Road	Albany		
House	47	41-45	Seymour Street	Mira Mar		
House	49	93	Spencer Street	Albany		
Terrace House	50	71-73	Spencer Street	Albany		
Norman House & Magnolia Tree and Cheyne's Cottage & Oak Tree	54	28-30	Stirling Terrace	Albany	Bellevue (Dyme), Moir House, Toc H Canteen, Norman House Cottage, Hassell Hse, Edward Hse	
Craft Shop	55		Stirling Terrace	Albany		
House	56		Stirling Terrace	Albany		
Imported cobblestones	57		Stirling Terrace	Albany		
House	70	Lot 197	Vancouver Street	Albany		
St John's Hall	72		York Street	Albany	St John's Church Hall	
Treasure's Building	76	137-139	York Street	Albany		
Premier Hotel	80	194-200	York Street	Albany		
Cape Riche Homestead	81		Cape Riche, 120 km East of	Albany	Moirs Property	
Millbrook's Saw Mill Site	82	At head of	Mill Brook 30 km North of	Albany	Millbrook Sawmill	
Oyster Harbour Fish Trap Site	83		North End of Oyster Harbour, 10 km North-East of Albany	Albany	Albany Fish Traps	
Vancouver's Cairn	85		Possession Pt, Vancouver Pen	Albany	The Cairn	
Bornholm Kronkup District Hall	86		Lower Denmark Road	Bornholm		
Elleker Hall	87	19-21	Brassey Street	Elleker		
Kalgan Hall (Upper)	88		James Street	Kalgan		
Torbay Hall	90		Hunwick South Road	Torbay		
Hall	91			Youngs		
Dalgety's Wool Warehouse	2348	22-32	Proudlove Parade	Albany		
Heritage Park	3255	bounded by	Hare, Watkin, Hill, Innes, Burgoyne & King George Sound	Albany	Mr Clarence, Mt Adelaide & Point King, Princess Royal Fort	
Albany Road Board Building (former)	3304	242-244	Stirling Terrace	Albany		
Thomson House	3305	167	Middleton Road	Albany		
Wheeldon's Cottage (former)	3328	92-98	Aberdeen Street	Albany	Professional Offices	
House	3329	78	Brunswick Road	Port Albany		
House	3331	60	Grey Street	Albany	Salvation Army House (former)	
House	3332	148	Grey Street	Albany		
House	3333	153	Grey Street	Albany		
House	3334	170	Grey Street	Albany		
House	3335	41	Melville Street	Albany		
House	3336	33	Rowley Street	Albany		
Merfield House	3337	142	Serpentine Road	Albany		
House	3338	64	Spencer Street	Albany		
House	3340	28	Vancouver Street	Albany		
House	3341	82	Vancouver Street	Albany		
Cossies Cottage	3347	89	Spencer Street	Albany		
Palmdale Farm	3408	Junction	Corimup & Palmdale Roads, Many Peaks	Albany		
Frenchmans Bay	3559		Frenchmans Bay	Albany		
Cliff Way	3571		Under Cliff Street	Albany		
The White House	3855	1	Wylie Cescent	Middleton Beach	Fernhill	
Prideaux Cottage	3920	Corner	Prideaux & Nanarup Roads	Lower Kalgan	Hockley House	
House	3929	58	Vancouver Street	Albany		
House	4037	17	Bay Street	Albany		
Whispering Pines	4297	120	Burgoyne Road	Albany		
Dog Rock	4400	298	Middleton Beach Road	Albany		
House ^{†}	4649	83	Cockburn Road	Albany	Demolished in 1996	
Marbelup Cottage	5602		Young's Siding	Marbelup		
Railway Siding	6831			Redmond		
Brackenhurst	7438	68	Brunswick Road	Port Albany		
Customs House	8735	99-111	Brunswick Road	Albany		
Old Furnace	8838		Albany Foreshore	Albany		
Basil Road Nature Reserve	9196		Basil Road	Wellstead		
Lake Powell Nature Reserve	9197		Denmark Road	Elleker		
WWII Lookout	10312		Mount Clarence	Albany		
Veterinary Hospital	10340		Lockyer Road	Albany		
Smith's Cottage (former)	10446	34-36	Stead Road	Centennial Park		
Railway Siding	12819			Marbelup		
House	12820	36	Cliff Street	Albany	Luxmoore	
Albany Town Jetty (ruins)	13032			Albany		
House	13152	195	Middleton Road	Mount Clarence		
Albany Fire Station (former) ^{†}	14428		York Street	Albany	Demolished in 1938	
National Bank of Australia (former)	14777	38	Frederick Street	Albany	Residence	
Lockyer Uniting Church & Hall	14992		Townsend Street	Lockyer		
Manse	14993	155	Serpentine Road	Albany		
Tree - Conifer	15148	176	Middleton Road	Mira Mar		
Upper King River Road Bridge	15401		South Coast Hwy	Upper King	MRWA 890	
House (former)	15427	24	Aberdeen Street	Albany	Professional Offices	
House (former)	15428	43	Aberdeen Street	Albany	Professional Offices	
House - Professional Offices	15429	47	Aberdeen Street	Albany		
House (former)	15430	61	Aberdeen Street	Albany	Professional Offices	
House (former)	15431	65	Aberdeen Street	Albany	Professional Offices	
House (former)	15432	78-84	Aberdeen Street	Albany	Professional Offices	
House - Professional Offices	15434	55	Albany Highway	Albany		
House	15435	135	Albany Highway	Mount Melville		
House	15436	137	Albany Highway	Mount Melville		
Avrilton	15437	11	Alexander Street	Centennial Park	Stone Cottage	
Mass Rocks	15438	3	Bolt Terrace	Port Albany	Rocking Stones	
Austin House	15439	66	Brunswick Road	Port Albany		
Ailsa Craige	15440	120	Brunswick Road	Albany	Lawley House	
Lawley Park & Lawley Park Tennis Courts	15441	133	Brunswick Road	Albany		
Spencer Memorial and Significant Trees	15442	133	Brunswick Road	Albany		
Parkville House	15443	136	Brunswick Road	Albany		
House	15444	137	Brunswick Road	Albany		
Glen Affric House	15445	138	Brunswick Road	Albany	Ivanhoe House	
Lookout Rocks	15446	57-59	Burgoyne Road	Port Albany		
The Priory	15447	55-59	Burt Street	Albany		
House	15448	8	Cliff Street	Albany		
House	15449	40-42	Cliff Street	Albany		
Lockup & Residence (former)	15451	1	Collie Street	Albany		
Kia Ora House	15452	37	Collie Street	Albany		
Albany Frame Shop	15453	39	Collie Street	Albany		
Gilbert's Cottage	15454	49	Collie Street	Albany	Professional Offices	
House	15455	176	Serpentine Road	Mount Melville		
House	15456	37	Crossman Street	Mount Melville		
House	15457	5	Cuthbert Street	Albany		
Semi-detached Houses	15458		Cuthbert Street	Albany		
House	15459	21	Cuthbert Street	Albany		
House	15460	23	Cuthbert Street	Albany		
House	15461	26	Cuthbert Street	Albany		
House	15462	27	Cuthbert Street	Albany		
House	15463	32	Cuthbert Street	Albany		
Sherratt House	15469	39	Collie Street	Albany	Professional Offices	
Bayview House (former)	15470	49-53	Duke Street	Albany	Youth Hostel - Backpackers	
Church (former)	15471	35	Earl Street	Albany	Residence	
Lavender Cottage	15472	10	Festing Street	Albany		
House	15473	14	Festing Street	Albany		
House	15474	27	Festing Street	Albany		
House	15475	16	Finlay Street	Albany		
House	15476	18	Finlay Street	Albany		
Ellen Cove Jetty & Norfolk Island Pine Trees	15477		Flinders Parade	Middleton Beach		
CWA Seaside Flats	15478	37	Flinders Parade	Middleton Beach	CWA Hostel, Albany	
Mongup House	15479	27	Frederick Street	Albany		
Oakview Cottages	15480	30	Frederick Street	Albany		
Oakview Cottages	15481	32	Frederick Street	Albany		
Dalacelil	15482	34	Frederick Street	Albany		
House	15484	58	Frederick Street	Albany		
House	15485	2/18	Golflinks Road	Middleton Beach		
Salvation Army Hall (former)	15486	66	Grey Street	Albany		
Peruvian Pepper Tree	15487	122	Grey Street	Albany		
House	15488	160	Grey Street	Albany		
House	15489	172	Grey Street	Albany		
House	15490	176	Grey Street	Albany		
House	15491	178	Grey Street	Albany		
House	15492	183	Grey Street	Albany		
House	15493	194	Grey Street	Albany		
McKenzie House	15494	198	Grey Street	Albany	White House	
House	15496	208	Grey Street	Albany		
House	15497	11	Hotchin Avenue	Albany		
House	15498	31	John Street	Mount Clarence	Snug	
House	15500	34	Melville Street	Albany		
House	15502	89	Middleton Road	Middleton Beach		
The Gums	15503	13/165	Middleton Road	Mount Clarence		
Tree	15504	176	Middleton Road	Mira Mar		
House	15505	195	Middleton Road	Albany		
House	15506	215	Middleton Road	Mount Clarence		
Oakview Cottage	15507	216	Middleton Road	Mira Mar		
House	15508	226	Middleton Road	Mira Mar		
Bob Thomson Gardens	15509	277-291	Middleton Road	Mount Clarence		
House	15510	5	Mill Street	Albany		
House	15511	9	Mill Street	Albany		
Albany Woollen Mills	15512	11-13	Mill Street	Albany	WA Worsted & Woollen Mills	
Roseneath or Hoseiath Cottage	15514	9	Parade Street	Albany		
House	15515	11	Parade Street	Albany		
House	15516	14	Parade Street	Albany		
House	15517	15	Parade Street	Albany		
House	15518	28	Parade Street	Albany		
Apex Park	15519	1-15	Parker Street	Albany		
Nesbitt Gardens and Palm Tree	15520	Lot 829	Peels Place	Albany		
Moirs Buildings	15521	2-14	Peels Place	Albany		
Lavender Cottage	15522	55	Peels Place	Albany		
Nurses Memorial Gardens	15523	50-54	Proudlove Parade	Albany	RSL Memorial Gardens, Queens Gardens, RSL Gardens	
Millars Sawdust Kiln	15524		Railway Reserve	Albany		
House	15525	2	Rowley Street	Albany		
House	15526	4	Rowley Street	Albany		
House	15527	12	Rowley Street	Albany		
House	15528	27	Rowley Street	Albany		
House	15529	39	Rowley Street	Albany		
House	15530	46	Rowley Street	Albany		
House	15531	34	Serpentine Road	Albany		
Somerville	15532	148 - 150	Serpentine Road	Albany		
House	15533	154	Serpentine Road	Mount Melville		
House	15534	197	Serpentine Road	Mount Melville		
Mount Melville	15535		Serpentine & Hanrahan Road	Mount Melville	Mokare Park	
House	15537	62	Spencer Street	Albany		
House	15538	88	Spencer Street	Albany		
House	15539	92	Spencer Street	Albany		
Army Drill Hall (former)	15540	96-106	Spencer Street	Albany	MacCracken's Textile College & School of Weav, Textile School	
House	15542	86	Stead Road	Centennial Park		
House ^{†}	15543	94	Stead Road	Centennial Park	Demolished in 2000	
House - Two Units	15544	22/U 1 & 2	Stirling Terrace	Albany		
Kent House	15545	24	Stirling Terrace	Albany		
Belburne	15546	26	Stirling Terrace	Albany		
House	15555	4	Symers Street	Mira Mar		
Old Surrey House & The Priory Group	15556	5-11 & 55-59	Thomas Street & Burt Street	Mount Clarence & Albany	Old Surrey House	
House	15557	6	Vancouver Street	Albany	Mortimore	
House	15558	10	Vancouver Street	Albany		
House	15559	12	Vancouver Street	Albany		
Dalkeith (former)	15560	24-26	Vancouver Street	Albany	Brackley Flats	
House	15561	27	Vancouver Street	Albany		
House	15563	54	Vancouver Street	Albany		
House	15564	62	Vancouver Street	Albany		
House	15565	68	Vancouver Street	Albany		
House	15566	74	Vancouver Street	Albany		
House	15567	80	Vancouver Street	Albany		
The Spot Cash Draper Shop (former)	15568	146	York Street	Albany	D T Thomas, Wilf's, Beal's	
Baesjou Cottage	15569	148-154	York Street	Albany		
Alison Hartman Gardens & Significant Trees	15570	239-259	York Street	Albany	Quereus Robur & Norfolk Pine Trees	
Albany Hotel	15571	244-248	York Street	Albany		
Hordern's Monument	15572		York Street	Albany		
Albany Airfield and 'Sigint' Radar System	15574	Albany Airport	Albany Highway	Willyung	Signals Intelligence Radio Monitor System	
Balgownie	15575		Norwood Road	King River		
Fisherman's Shack (former)	15576		Two Peoples Bay	Albany	CALM Office	
Dymesbury Park Stables	15577		Chester Pass Road	King River		
Eyre and Wylie Memorial	15578		Allambie Park Cemetery	Walmsley		
Fishtraps	15580	500 m South	Kalgan River Hall	Kalgan River		
Gomm Cottage	15581		Davies Road	Lower Kalgan		
Greendale	15583	1454	Millbrook Road	Millbrook		
Corrugated Iron Cottage	15584		Lower Denmark Road	Cuthbert		
Rainscourt	15585	Lot 184	Nanarup Road	Lower Kalgan		
House - Stone - North's	15586	Lot 23	North Road	Grasmere		
House - Stone - North's	15587	Loc 960	Elleker-Grasmere Road	Kalgan		
Lower Kalgan Hall	15589		Nanarup Road	Lower Kalgan		
Lakeside Farm (former)	15590	514	Elleker-Grasmere Road	Elleker	Burleigh	
Maitland	15591	Lot 24	Hassell Highway	Upper Kalgan		
Millbrook House	15593	Lot 20	Millbrook Road	King River		
Napier Hall	15594		Chester Pass Road	Napier		
Pendeen Homestead	15595		Willyung Road	King River		
Sherwood	15596		Willyung Road	King River		
Springmount	15597	Lot 1	Nanarup Road	Nanarup		
Station Master's House, Elleker	15598	Lot 90	Brassey Street	Elleker	Station Master's House	
Stranmore Bungalow	15599		East Bank Road	Lower Kalgan		
Sunnyside Homestead	15600	Loc 422	Affleck Road	Lower Kalgan		
The Homestead	15601		Homestead Road	Manypeaks		
Vancouver Spring	15602		Frenchman Bay	Frenchman Bay		
Willyung Cottage, Stables & Pendeen Homestead Group	15603		Willyung Road	Willyung & King River	Willyung Cottage and Stables	
Windy Hill	15604	Lot 2	Eastbank Road	Lower Kalgan		
Candyup	15606			Lower Kalgan River		
Coastwatchers World War II	15607			Forsythe Bluff		
Depression Campsite	15608	Off	Chester Pass Road	Albany		
First Bridge on Yacamia Creek	15609		Lower King Road	Yakamia	Yacamia Creek, Bridge No 4751	
Gledhow Railway Siding (incl. Telegraph Poles & Culverts)	15610			Gledhow		
Gravesite of Mokare	15611	Corner	Collie & Grey Streets	Albany		
Hangar and Launching Ramp for Spotter Plane	15612			Lower Kalgan		
Hopson's Tearooms	15613			Lower Kalgan		
Johnson's Ferry	15614		Johnson Cove	Albany		
Elleker to Youngs War Memorial, WW1 & WW2 - Bornholm-Kronkup Dist Hall	15615		Lower Denmark Road	Bornholm via Albany		
Kronkup & District Honour Roll - WW1 - Bornholm-Kronkup Dist Hall	15616		Lower Denmark Road	Bornholm via Albany		
Albany War Memorial, WW1, WW2, Korea, Vietnam	15617	Corner	York Street & Peels Place	Albany		
Avenue of Honour	15619		Apex Drive, Mt Clarence	Albany		
Gallipoli Pine, WW1	15620		Mt Clarence	Albany		
Atatürk Entrance, WW1	15621		Princess Royal Harbour	Albany		
Killarney Farm	15634		Downstream from Lower Kilgarn Bridge	Lower Kilgarn		
Little Grove Seaplane Base	15635			Little Grove		
Lower Kalgan School	15637		West Bank of the Lower Kalgan River	Lower Kalgan River		
McKail's Well	15638	Between	East Bank & Symer's	Kalgan River		
Overland Telegraph	15639			Mount Martin		
Patterson's Quarry Site	15640		Off Hunwick Road	Torbay	(Bacon & Sauce Factory)	
Point Henty	15641			Lower Kalgan		
Quarantine Ground	15642	Off	Mistaken Island	Albany		
Railway Bridge Remains at Hay River	15643			Hay River		
Railway Siding	15644			Bornholm		
Rifle Club	15645		Frenchman Bay Road	Albany		
Shell Grit Mill	15646	East side at	mouth of	Kalgan River		
Sherratt's Chimney	15647			Torbay		
Silver Mine Shaft	15648			Mount Boyle		
St Martin Camp Site	15649			Emu Point		
St Oswald's Church	15650			Kronkup		
St Patrick's Church	15651			Mount Lockyer		
Tannery	15652		Old School Road	Elleker		
Torbay Junction Railway Station	15653			Elleker		
Torbay Junction Hostelry	15654			Torbay		
Torbay Sawmills	15655			Torbay		
Vancouver Peninsula Camp Site	15656			Vancouver Peninsula		
Waychinnicup Cottage	15657			Waychinnicup		
Moxton's Sauce Factory	15658	Off	Meanwood Road	Albany		
Napier School	15659			Albany		
Old Lower Kalgan Track	15660	Along West bank	of River in Elbow	Kalgan		
House	15661	16	Bridges Street	Albany		
House	15662	28-30	Cliff Street	Albany		
House	15664	26	Frederick Street	Albany		
House	15665	29	John Street	Albany		
House	15666	2	Knight Street	Albany		
House	15667	27	Knight Street	Albany		
House	15668	2	Meyers Way	Albany		
House	15669	57	Spencer Street	Albany		
House	15670	94	Vancouver Street	Albany		
House	15671	39-41	View Street	Albany		
House	15672	12-14	Young Street	Albany	Young House - Youth Accommodation	
Canning and Trautmans' House	15673		North Road	Albany		
Lower King Store	15674			Albany		
No. 35 Radar Station - World War 2 Radar Station	15845		Stony Hill Torndirrup National Park	Albany	World War 2 Radar Station, Stony Hill, Stony Ridge	
House	15967	52	Frederick Street	Albany		
Houses	16583	63 -73	Spencer Street	Albany		
Scarred Tree	16584		Nambucca Rs	Lower Kalgan	Swamp paperbark - Melaleuca sp	
Douglas House	16628	26	Riverside Road	Kalgan	Myola	
Two Peoples Bay	16780	off	Two Peoples Bay Road	Albany	Baie des Deux Peuples, Coffin Cove	
Emu Point Cottages ^{†}	16806	17, 19, 21, 23	Cunningham Street	Emu Point	Eden Deal, Oomo, Moyes, Sippe, Anderson & Fowler cottages Demolished in 2004	
Albany Police Complex	17334		Stirling Terrace	Albany		
Brunswick Road Drill Hall	17519		Brunswick	Albany	Navy Drill Hall	
Middleton Beach	17520			Albany		
Albany airfield and 'Sigint'	17521			Albany		
Albany Waterfront	17622			Albany		
Norfolk Pines	17771		Flinders Parade	Middleton Beach		
York Street Precinct	17810		York Street	Albany		
House, 36 Brunswick Street	17871	36	Brunswick Street	Albany	Police Inspector's Quarters	
Amity Heritage Precinct, Albany	18405			Albany		
Bornholm Shed	18407		Sheppard's Lagoon	Albany		
6 Houses, Chester Pass Road	18471			Albany		
Arpenteur Shipwreck	18592			Hassel Beach via Manypeaks		
Gull Rock National Park	18647		Gull Rock Road	Albany		
Hassell National Park	18652		South Coast Highway	Manypeaks		
King George Sound/Princess Royal Harbour Marine Area	18671			Albany		
Lady Lyttleton Wreck	18673			Albany		
Manfred Shipwreck	18685			Beagle Bay Community Via Lombadina Mission		
Torndirrup National Park	18738		Frenchmans Bay Road	Albany		
Esplanade Hotel site ^{†}	18916		Middleton Beach	Albany	Albany Esplanade Hotel (former), Sock Fence Demolished in 2007	
Bomb Shelter	18953		2.7 km North-West of Gunn Road	Albany		
Cape Riche	23579	1550	Cape Riche Road	Wellstead		
Drew Street Oak Trees, Albany	23639	24-32	Drew Street	Seppings		
Grey Street West Precinct	24001		Grey Street West	Albany		
Albany Fire Station (Volunteer Fire & Rescue Service)	24462	12	Merrifield Street	Albany		
Cheynes Cottage and Oak Tree	24551	28-30	Stirling Terrace	Albany		
House, 15 Angus Street, Mount Melville	25332	15	Angus Street	Mount Melville		
Bridge on Hunton Road over Chelgiup Creek, Kalgan	25531			Kalgan	MRWA Bridge 4917	
Mount Lockyer Primary School	26364	22	Humpreys Street	Lockyer		
Bridge 0083 South Coast Highway over Sleeman River, Albany	26466					
Albany Entertainment Centre	26889	6	Toll Place	Albany		
Reeves Timber Yard and Hardware	26890	36-40	Spencer Street	Albany	Activ, Thrift Shop	
Cuthbert Street Precinct	26891	5-38	Cuthbert Street	Albany		
House	26892	15	Aberdeen Street	Albany		
House	26893	86	Aberdeen Street	Albany	Chilvers Legal, Solicitors	
House	26894	51	Albany Highway	Albany	Capararo House, Aboriginal Legal Service of Western Australia Inc. (ALSWA), Paramount College of Natural Medicine	
House	26895	96	Brunswick Road	Port Albany		
House	26896	13-17	Cuthbert Street	Albany		
Conelma	26897	61-63	Duke Street	Albany		
House	26898	6	Finlay	Albany		
Dunrossness Cottage	26899	10	Finlay Street	Albany		
Watami / Green Island	26900	R24808	Oyster Harbour	Miaritch / Oyster Harbour / Emu Point		
Tjuitgellong / Lake Seppings	26901		Lake Seppings Drive	Seppings	Lake Seppings Nature Reserve	
House	26902	20	Mermaid Avenue	Emu Point		
Spencer Park Wildflower Reserve	26903	R28725	Mokare Road	Spencer Park	Pitcher Plant Reserve, Spencer Park Recreation Reserve	
Mutenup / Foundation Park	26904	25-35	Parade Street	Albany	Parade Street Oval, Parade Street Parade Ground, Public Gardens	
Central Datum Point and Military Station Flagstaff	26905	Nil	Parade Street	Albany	Site of Flag Pole	
House	26906	10	Rowley Street	Albany		
House	26907	14	Rowley Street	Albany	Kinjarling	
House	26908	37	Rowley Street	Albany		
Merri Fields	26909	41	Rowley Street	Albany		
House	26910	70	Vancouver	Albany		
Celurca	26911	76	Vancouver	Albany		
St Albans Buildings	26912	130-132	York Street	Albany	Eziwalkin Shoes, Majuba Bistro, Kodak Film Shop, Regent Theatre, Mainstreet Shoes and Bags, Mini Manchester	
Albany Advertiser and Printing Works	26913	165	York St	Albany	Newspaper House	
House	26914	8	Vancouver Street	Albany	Mortimore	
Berryman's Store	26915	65	Vancouver Street	Albany	Berryman's Melvane Store Colonial Store, Berryman Bros., Vancouver Street Cafe	
Waggon Rock	26916	24	Serpentine East Road	Mount Clarence	Waggon Rocks,Wagon Rock	
Burmup / Bluff Rock	26917	16	Tassell Street	Spencer Park	Barmup, Bluff Rock Reserve, Craggy Bluff, Bluff Rocks	
Norman House and Magnolia Tree	26924	28-30	Stirling Terrace	Albany	Moir House, Belle-vue,Hassell House, Edward House, Toc H Canteen	
RAAF Operation and Power Bunker	26926	35494	Albany Highway	Drome	Operation Bunker	
Balston Gardens	26939	46-92	Burgoyne Road	Albany	Public Gardens, Heritage Park	
House	27054	218	Middleton Road	Mira Mar		
House	27055	12	Grey Street East	Albany		
House	27056	38	Cliff Street	Albany		
House	27057	139c	Albany Highway	Mount Melville		
House	27058	16	Cunningham Street	Emu Point		
House	27059	86	Spencer Street	Albany		
House	27060	66	Spencer Street	Albany		
House	27061	61	Spencer Street	Albany		
Pickwick House	27062	97	Spencer Street	Albany		
House	27063	28	Spencer Street	Albany	Stirling Terrace Precinct, Spencer Cottage	
Dunmoylen	27064	118	Brunswick Road	Albany	Dunmoylen House, Harbour View, Memories	
House	27065	14	Finlay Street	Albany		
House	27066	14	Bridges Street	Albany		
House	27068	84	Spencer Street	Albany		
House	27069	32	Stirling Terrace	Albany	Stirling Terrace Precinct	
Old Frederickstown Precinct	27272		Parade Street	Albany		
Bibbulmun Track	27521			From Kalamunda to Albany		

- ^{†} Denotes building has been demolished
