= Mettler, Western Australia =

Locality in the City of Albany, Western Australia

Mettler
- Interactive map of Mettler
- Coordinates: 34.55558°S 118.58640°E
- Country: Australia
- State: Western Australia
- LGA: City of Albany
- Location: 386 km (240 mi) SE of Perth; 80 km (50 mi) E of Albany

Government
  - State electorate: Albany
  - Federal division: O'Connor

Area
  - Total: 244.5 km^{2} (94.4 sq mi)

Population
  - Total: 35 (SAL 2021)
- Postcode: 6328
Localities around Mettler
| Kojaneerup South | Wellstead | Wellstead |
| Green Range | Mettler | Wellstead |
| | Southern Ocean |

Mettler is a locality of the City of Albany in the Great Southern region of Western Australia, located along the Southern Ocean. The South Coast Highway passes through the northern part of the locality. Mettler is home to two nature reserves, the Mettler Lake Nature Reserve and the Basil Road Nature Reserve, while the far eastern end on Hassell National Park extends into the west of the locality.

Mettler is on the traditional land of the Minang people of the Noongar nation.

== Nature reserves ==
The Basil Road Nature Reserve was gazetted on 3 May 1968 and has a size of 11.62 square kilometres (4.49 mi^{2}). The Mettler Lake Nature Reserve was gazetted on 19 July 1963 and has a size of 4.02 square kilometres (1.55 mi^{2}). Both are located within the Esperance Plains bioregion.

Wilyun Pools, a farm in Mettler, forms a wildlife corridor for the two nature reserves and Hassell National Park. During the 1950s and 1960s, widespread land clearing destroyed 88 percent of the native flora on the farm's land, which is now being restored through conservation efforts. The farm won the 2022 Australian Government Landcare farming award.
