= Walmsley, Western Australia =

Locality in the City of Albany, Western Australia

Walmsley
- other
- Coordinates: 34.98152°S 117.89987°E
- Country: Australia
- State: Western Australia
- LGA: City of Albany
- Location: 386 km (240 mi) SE of Perth; 6 km (3.7 mi) N of Albany

Government
  - State electorate: Albany
  - Federal division: O'Connor

Area
  - Total: 10.6 km^{2} (4.1 sq mi)

Population
  - Total: 47 (SAL 2021)
- Postcode: 6330
Localities around Walmsley
Willyung	King River	Lower King
Warrenup	Walmsley	Bayonet Head
Milpara	Lange	Bayonet Head

Walmsley is a locality of the City of Albany in the Great Southern region of Western Australia. Chester Pass Road forms the western boundary of Walmsley.

Walmsley is on the traditional land of the Minang people of the Noongar nation.

The heritage-listed Eyre and Wylie Memorial is located in Walmsley, within Allambie Park Cemetery. Edward John Eyre and his Aboriginal companion Wylie traversed the Nullarbor Plain in 1841, crossing from Fowlers Bay, South Australia, to Albany. The memorial is located at the end point of their track and is one of five to commemorate the journey. It was installed around 1965.
