= Albany (suburb) =

Suburb of the City of Albany, Western Australia

- Suburb
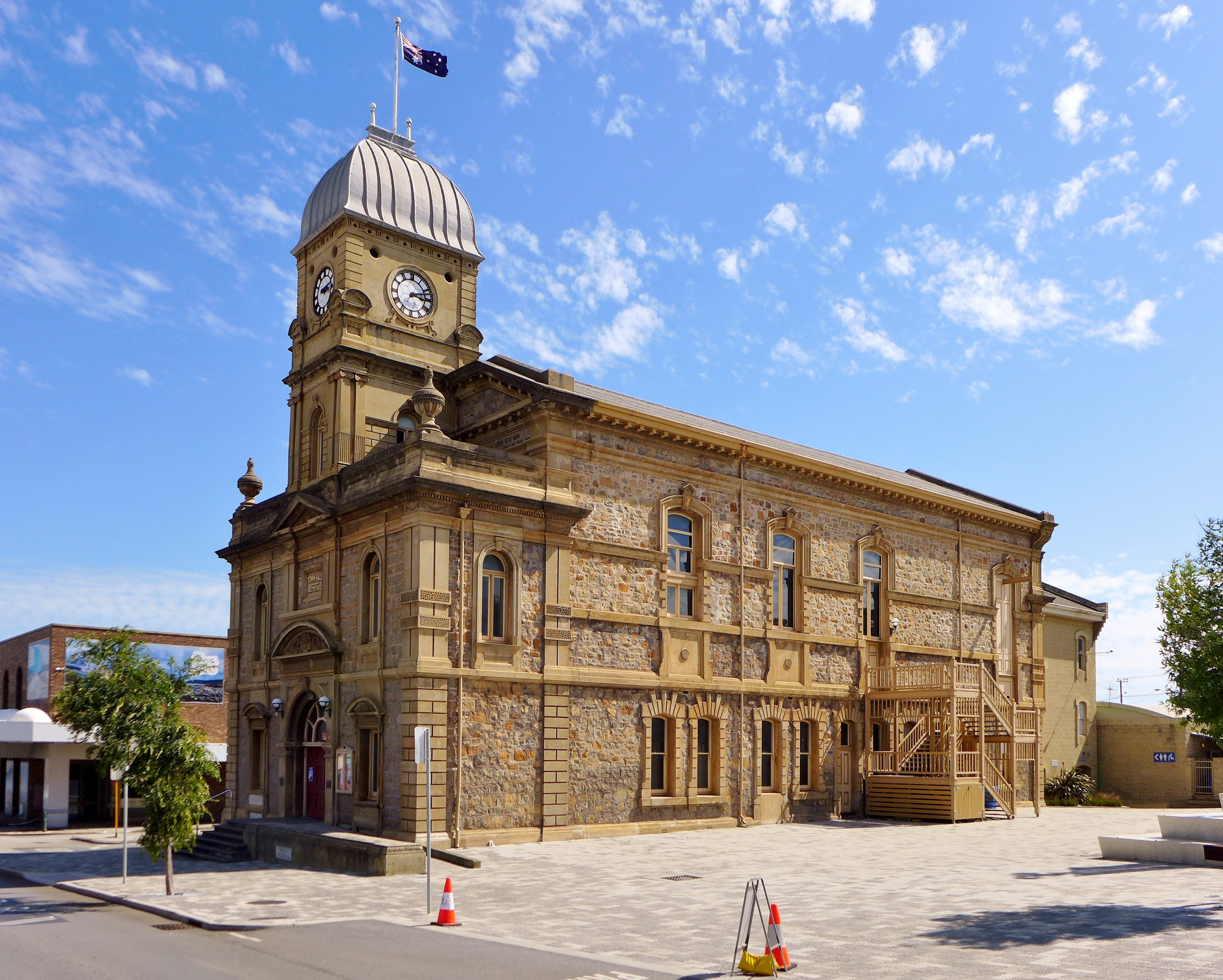
- The historic Albany Town Hall

- Coordinates: 35.01730°S 117.88378°E
- Country: Australia
- State: Western Australia
- LGA: City of Albany

Government
  - State electorate: Albany
  - Federal division: O'Connor

Area
  - Total: 2.4 km^{2} (0.93 sq mi)

Population
  - Total: 1,403 (SAL 2021)
- Postcode: 6330
Suburbs around Albany
Mount Melville	Centennial Park	Mount Clarence
Mount Melville	Albany	Port Albany
	Princess Royal Harbour

The suburb of Albany is the central business district of the City of Albany in the Great Southern region of Western Australia. The suburb is bounded by the Princess Royal Harbour to the south. The southern terminus of the Albany Highway is located within the suburb, at York Street.

The suburb is located on the traditional land of the Minang people of the Noongar nation.

The historic nature of the suburb is evident in the 334 entries in the heritage register, of which 82 are on the Western Australian State Register of Heritage Places.
