= Millbrook, Western Australia =

Locality in the City of Albany, Western Australia

Millbrook
- Interactive map of Millbrook
- Coordinates: 34°54′40″S 117°52′27″E
- Country: Australia
- State: Western Australia
- LGA: City of Albany
- Location: 379 km (235 mi) SE of Perth; 12 km (7.5 mi) N of Albany

Government
  - State electorate: Albany
  - Federal division: O'Connor

Area
  - Total: 19.2 km^{2} (7.4 sq mi)

Population
  - Total: 284 (SAL 2021)
- Postcode: 6330
Localities around Millbrook
Green Valley	Green Valley	Napier
Green Valley	Millbrook	Napier
Willyung	Willyung	King River

Millbrook is a locality of the City of Albany in the Great Southern region of Western Australia. The King River forms the south-western border of the locality. The Mill Brook runs through the locality from north to south before flowing into the King River at its southern border. The Mill Brook Nature Reserve however is located further upstream, in the locality of Green Valley.

Millbrook is on the traditional land of the Minang people of the Noongar nation.

The heritage listed Lange Homestead is located within Millbrook. A homestead, originally called Tukurua then renamed to Greendale, was built in 1912 and 1913. It is one of the oldest stone buildings in the area. The property was purchased in 1929 by Friedrich Wilhelm Lange, who had previously been an early settler in the Wandering area; he renamed the property Greendale after his previous residence there. His son Benno Lange took over the property and was the chairman of the Albany Road Board and the president of the Albany Shire Council for 21 consecutive years. Lange was awarded the Order of Australia and sold the property in 1973.

The small river flowing through the locality, the Mill Brook, has a catchment area of 180 square kilometres (69 mi^{2}).
