= Bayonet Head, Western Australia =

Coordinates: 34°58′41″S 117°55′59″E

Bayonet Head Albany, Western Australia
- Population: 3,272 (SAL 2021)
- Postcode(s): 6330
- Area: 5.5 km^{2} (2.1 sq mi)
- Location: 9 km (6 mi) from Albany
- LGA(s): City of Albany
- State electorate(s): Albany
- Federal division(s): O'Connor
Suburbs around Bayonet Head:
| King River | Lower King | Kalgan |
| Walmsley | Bayonet Head |
| Lange | Collingwood Heights | Emu Point |

Bayonet Head is an outer north-eastern suburb of Albany, Western Australia, on the west bank of Oyster Harbour. Its local government area is the City of Albany. Until the 1980s, it was known as Flinders Park.

== Geography ==
Bayonet Head is bounded by Elizabeth Street to the north, Lower King Road to the west, Yakamia Creek to the south and Oyster Harbour to the east. Most of the suburb's population is concentrated around Bayonet Head Road, which runs east–west through the main part of the suburb.

At the 2011 census, 2'490 people lived within the suburb's boundaries, an increase from 2,304 in 2006 and 1,934 in 2001.

== History ==
The suburb was gazetted in 1981.

== Facilities ==
Bayonet Head is a residential suburb, although large areas of native bushland can be found in the centre and along Yakamia Creek. Several reserves, including the Bayonet Head Lookout which overlooks Oyster Harbour, Emu Point and Gull Rock National Park, offer recreational and picnic facilities. On Lower King Road, there is a store, fuel station and accommodation.

The suburb contains a primary school, Flinders Park Primary (1978) with a student population of approximately 520. High school students have the option of going to St Joseph's College, a private Catholic school in Spencer Park; Great Southern Grammar, a private Christian school in the Kalgan River area; Albany Senior High School (ASHS), a government run school located near the city's CBD and North Albany Senior High School, another government run school located near the city's TAFE campus.

== Transport ==
Bayonet Head can be reached from Albany via Collingwood and Lower King Road, and it is served by Route 401 from Albany operated by Love's Bus Service.
