= Big Grove =

Big Grove can refer to:

- Big Grove Township, Kendall County, Illinois
- Big Grove Township, Benton County, Iowa
- Big Grove, Western Australia, locality of the City of Albany
