= Grasmere =

Grasmere may refer to:

== Australia ==
- Grasmere, New South Wales
- Grasmere, Western Australia, a suburb of Albany

== Canada ==
- Grasmere, British Columbia
- Grasmere, Ontario

== New Zealand ==
- Grasmere, New Zealand, in Invercargill
- Lake Grassmere

== United Kingdom ==
- Grasmere (lake), Cumbria, England
- Grasmere (village), Cumbria, England
- Grasmere Road Ground, Hampshire

== United States ==
- Grasmere, New Hampshire
- Grasmere (Rhinebeck, New York), a former estate of Chancellor Livingston
- Grasmere, Staten Island, New York
  - Grasmere (Staten Island Railway station)
- Grasmere, Idaho, a ghost town
- Grasmere, a neighborhood of Fairfield, Connecticut
