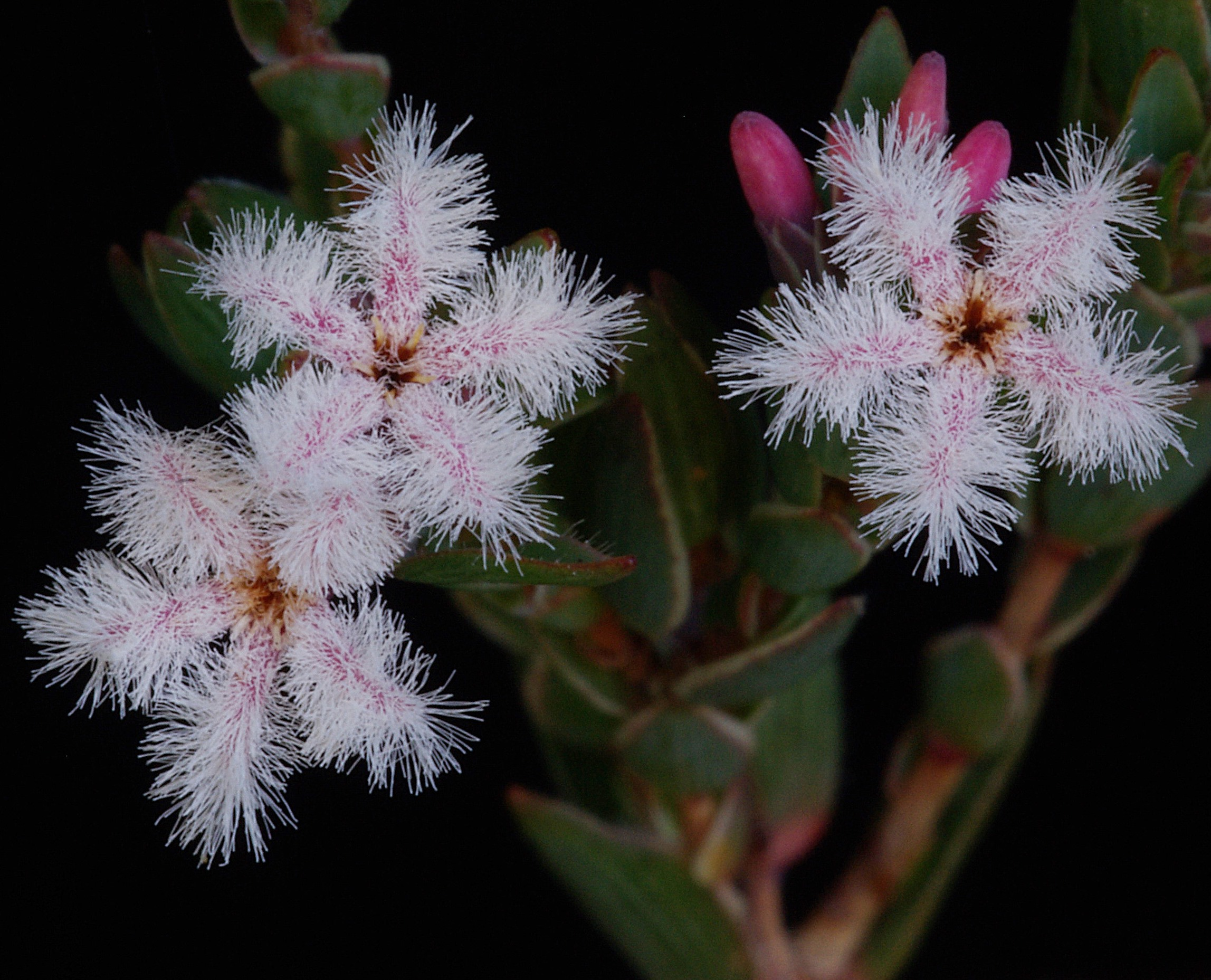
- Subspecies elegans

Scientific classification
- Kingdom: Plantae
- Clade: Tracheophytes
- Clade: Angiosperms
- Clade: Eudicots
- Clade: Asterids
- Order: Ericales
- Family: Ericaceae
- Genus: Leucopogon
- Species: L. elegans

Binomial name
- Leucopogon elegans Sond.
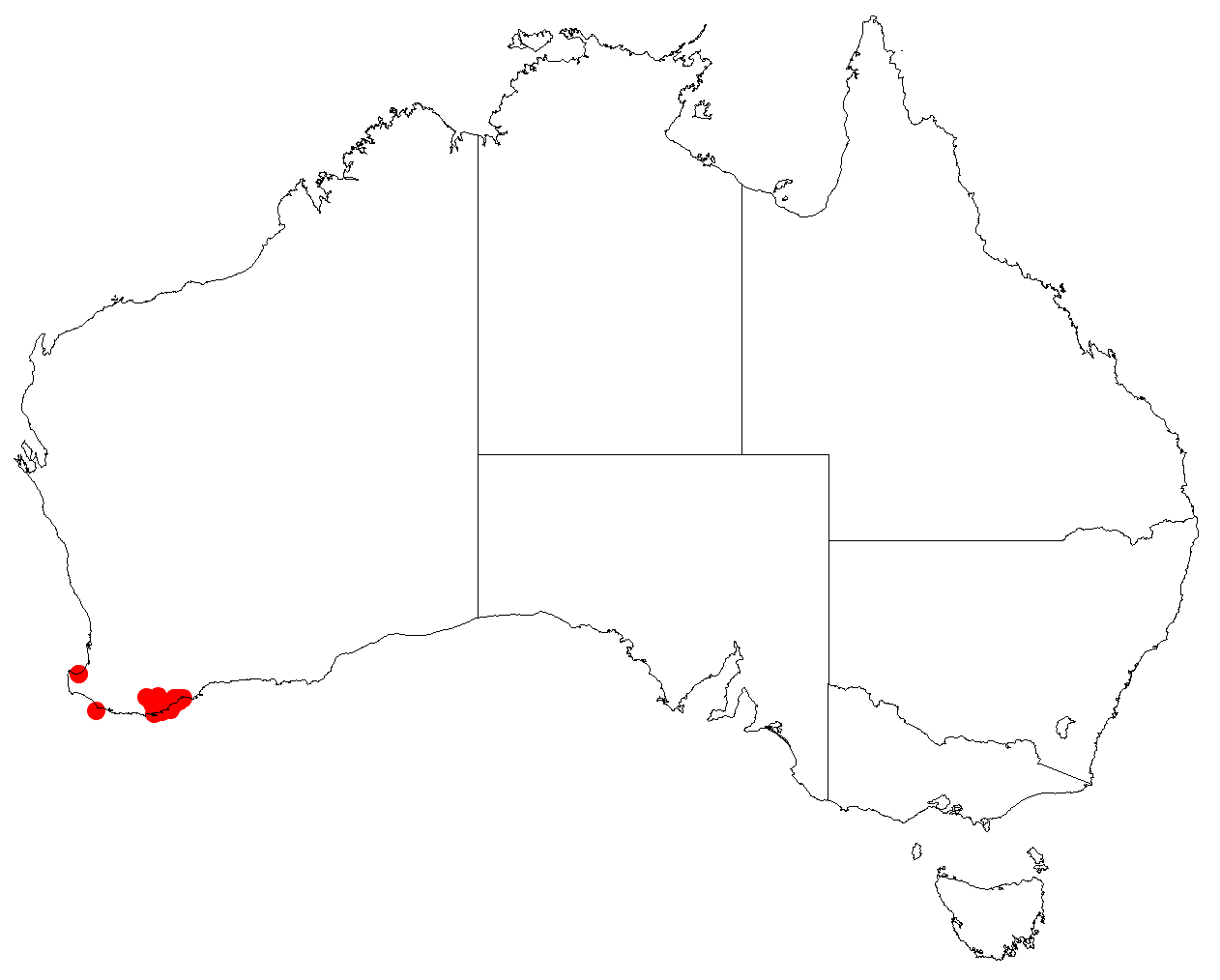
- Occurrence data from AVH

Synonyms
- Styphelia blepharophylla F.Muell. nom. illeg.

= Leucopogon elegans =

Species of plant

Leucopogon elegans is a species of flowering plant in the heath family Ericaceae and is endemic to the south-west of Western Australia. It is a spreading shrub with egg-shaped leaves, and white or pink, tube-shaped flowers densely bearded on the inside.

== Description ==
Leucopogon elegans is an erect or spreading shrub that typically grows up to a height of 50 cm (20 in) high and wide. Its leaves are narrowly egg-shaped to egg-shaped, 3.4–7.5 mm (0.13–0.30 in) long, 1.5–3.1 mm (0.059–0.122 in) wide and directed upwards on a petiole 0.5–1.6 mm (0.020–0.063 in) long. The flowers are arranged in groups of 4 to 11 on the ends of branches and in upper leaf axils with egg-shaped bracts and bracteoles at the base. The sepals are narrowly egg-shaped, 2.1–3.5 mm (0.083–0.138 in) long, the petals white or pink and joined at the base to form a narrowly bell-shaped tube 1.9–2.3 mm (0.075–0.091 in) long, the lobes 2.1–3.0 mm (0.083–0.118 in) long and densely hairy on the inside. Flowering mainly occurs from June to November.

== Taxonomy and naming ==
Leucopogon elegans was first formally described in 1845 by Otto Wilhelm Sonder in Johann Georg Christian Lehmann's Plantae Preissianae. The specific epithet (elegans) means "fine" or "elegant".

In 2009, Michael Clyde Hislop described two subspecies of L. elegans in the journal Nuytsia, and the names are accepted by the Australian Plant Census:

- Leucopogon elegans Sond. subsp. elegans has leaves that are more or less glabrous on the upper surface, and sepals 2.1–3.0 mm (0.083–0.118 in) long.
- Leucopogon elegans subsp. psorophyllus Hislop has leaves that are hairy on the upper surface, and sepals 2.9–3.8 mm (0.11–0.15 in) long.

== Distribution and habitat ==
Subspecies elegans grows in winter-wet heath and low woodland and is common between Two Peoples Bay and Cheynes Beach, and occurs in scattered locations from there to the southern Stirling Range in the Esperance Plains and Jarrah Forest bioregions of south-western Western Australia. Subspecies psorophyllus grows in heath or mallee woodland between Wellstead, Cape Riche and the Pallinup River in the Esperance Plains bioregion.

== Conservation status ==
Leucopogon elegans subsp. elegans is classified as "not threatened" but subsp. psorophyllus is listed as "Priority Three" by the Government of Western Australia Department of Biodiversity, Conservation and Attractions, meaning that it is poorly known and known from only a few locations but is not under imminent threat.
