= Lockyer, Western Australia =

Suburb of the City of Albany, Western Australia

Lockyer
- Suburb
- Coordinates: 35°00′17″S 117°51′29″E
- Country: Australia
- State: Western Australia
- City: Albany
- LGA: City of Albany
- Location: 4 km (2.5 mi) from Albany

Government
  - State electorate: Albany
  - Federal division: O'Connor

Area
  - Total: 1.3 km^{2} (0.50 sq mi)

Population
  - Total: 1,298 (SAL 2021)
- Postcode: 6330
Suburbs around Lockyer
McKail	Orana	Orana
Gledhow	Lockyer	Mount Melville
Gledhow	Mount Elphinstone	Mount Melville

Lockyer is a north-western suburb of the City of Albany in the Great Southern region of Western Australia. The suburb has a median age of 33, and was officially named in 1954.

== Geography ==
Lockyer is bounded to the North by the South Coast Highway, to the east by Hanrahan Road, to the south by Cuming Road and to the west by Cull Road.

== Facilities ==
The suburb has a local primary school within its boundaries, Mount Lockyer Primary School. Local students would attend North Albany Senior High School in Milpara for secondary education.
