= Port Albany =

Port Albany most commonly refers to:

- The original European name for Albany Island
- Port Albany, Western Australia, a suburb of the City of Albany
  - Port of Albany, a port located in the above suburb
- Port of Albany–Rensselaer, a port of entry in the United States
