= South Stirling, Western Australia =

Town in the City of Albany, Western Australia

South Stirling
- Town
- Interactive map of South Stirling
- Coordinates: 34°32′S 118°12′E
- Country: Australia
- State: Western Australia
- LGA: City of Albany
- Location: 423 km (263 mi) south east of Perth; 68 km (42 mi) e of Albany
- Established: 1959

Government
  - State electorate: Albany
  - Federal division: O'Connor

Area
  - Total: 148.4 km^{2} (57.3 sq mi)

Population
  - Total: 22 (SAL 2021)
- Postcode: 6324

South Stirling is a townsite and locality of the City of Albany in the Great Southern region of Western Australia. The entirety of the townsite is now located within the South Stirling Nature Reserve. it is located 75 kilometres (47 mi) north-east of Albany. At the 2021 census, it had a population of 22. It is situated at the foot of the Stirling Range. Other close small towns are Mount Barker, Wellstead, and Manypeaks.

The town was gazetted in 1959 and named after the near-by Stirling Range. The town was established in the early 1950s as part of the South Stirlings War Service Land Settlement Scheme but it was only gazetted after enough settlers had been attracted.

It is the hometown of Hockeyroos player Kathryn Slattery, who represents Australia in field hockey.

== Nature reserve ==
The South Stirling Nature Reserve was gazetted on 15 March 1963, has a size of 1.715 square kilometres (0.662 mi^{2}), and is located within the Esperance Plains bioregion.
