= Acacia delphina =

Scientific classification
- Kingdom: Plantae
- Clade: Tracheophytes
- Clade: Angiosperms
- Clade: Eudicots
- Clade: Rosids
- Order: Fabales
- Family: Fabaceae
- Subfamily: Caesalpinioideae
- Clade: Mimosoid clade
- Genus: Acacia
- Species: A. delphina

Binomial name
- Acacia delphina Maslin
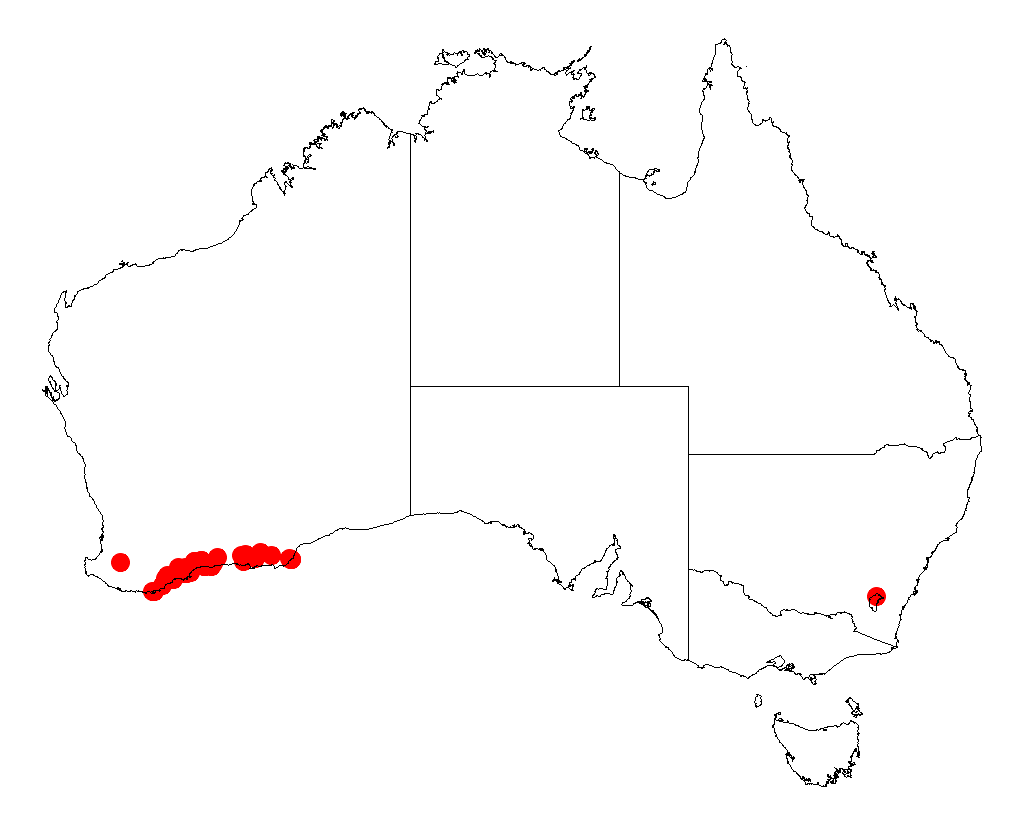
- Occurrence data from AVH

Synonyms
- Racosperma delphinum (Maslin) Pedley

Species of legume

Habit near Wellstead

Acacia delphina is a species of flowering plant in the family Fabaceae and is endemic to the south of Western Australia. It is a shrub with grey bark, more or less crescent-shaped phyllodes with a conspicuous triangular spur on the upper edge, oblong to shortly cylindrical spikes of pale yellow or golden yellow flowers and straight or slightly curved, firmly papery pods, more or less resembling a string of beads.

== Description ==
Acacia delphina is a diffuse, harsh shrub that typically grows to a height of 0.3–1 m (1 ft 0 in – 3 ft 3 in) and has branchlets covered with soft hairs when young. Its phyllodes are crescent shaped, 7–16 mm (0.28–0.63 in) long, 3–10 mm (0.12–0.39 in) wide with a conspicuous, triangular gland-bearing spur on the upper edge. The phyllodes are sharply pointed and the gland-bearing spur ends in a spine. The flowers are borne in an oblong to shortly cylindrical head in axils on a peduncle 1–7 mm (0.039–0.276 in) long, each head with 18 to 32 pale yellow or golden yellow flowers. Flowering occurs from July to October, and the pods are straight or slightly curved, up to 45 mm (1.8 in) long, 3–4 mm (0.12–0.16 in) wide, firmly papery, brown and more or less resembling a string of beads. The seeds are oblong to elliptic, 3–4 mm (0.12–0.16 in) long and dull brown, with a conical aril on the end.

== Taxonomy ==
Acacia delphina was first formally described in 1978 by Bruce Maslin in the journal Nuytsia from specimens collected near Hopetoun in 1965 by Kenneth Newbey. The specific epithet (delphina) means 'dolphin', referring to shape of the phyllodes that resemble a plunging dolphin.

== Distribution and habitat ==
This species of wattle usually grows on flats in sand or loam in undulating plains, low rises near salt flats in low, open woodland or tall shrubland in near-coastal areas between the Pallinup River and Israelite Bay in the Esperance Plains and Mallee bioregions of southern Western Australia.

== Conservation status ==
Acacia delphina is listed as 'Not threatened' by the Government of Western Australia Department of Biodiversity, Conservation and Attractions.

== See also ==
- List of Acacia species
