= Vancouver Peninsula =

Vancouver Peninsula may refer to:

- Burrard Peninsula, encompassing the entire city of Vancouver as well as the city of Burnaby and other areas to the east
- Downtown Peninsula, encompassing Downtown Vancouver, the West End and Stanley Park
- Vancouver Peninsula, Western Australia, locality in the City of Albany
