= Milpara, Western Australia =

Suburb of Albany, Western Australia

Milpara Albany, Western Australia
- Coordinates: 34°59′14″S 117°51′54″E
- Population: 953 (SAL 2021)
- Postcode(s): 6330
- Area: 2.1 km^{2} (0.8 sq mi)
- LGA(s): City of Albany
- State electorate(s): Albany
- Federal division(s): O'Connor
Suburbs around Milpara:
McKail	Warrenup	Walmsley
McKail	Milpara	Lange
McKail	Orana	Yakamia

Milpara is a north-western suburb of Albany in southern Western Australia. Its local government area is the City of Albany. The western boundary of the suburb is formed by the Albany Highway.

Milpara is on the traditional land of the Minang people of the Noongar nation.
