= Gledhow, Western Australia =

Suburb of the City of Albany, Western Australia

Coordinates: 35°00′06″S 117°48′54″E

Gledhow Albany, Western Australia
- Population: 1,079 (SAL 2021)
- Postcode(s): 6330
- Area: 6.6 km^{2} (2.5 sq mi)
- Location: 6.5 km (4 mi) from Albany
- LGA(s): City of Albany
- State electorate(s): Albany
- Federal division(s): O'Connor
Localities around Gledhow:
Marbelup	McKail	Orana
Cuthbert	Gledhow	Lockyer
Cuthbert	Robinson	Mount Elphinstone

Gledhow is a town and western suburb of Albany in southern Western Australia. Its local government area is the City of Albany. The suburb has a median age of 38.

The townsite of Gledhow was originally established as a private town in 1891 by the company constructing the Great Southern Railway, the W.A. Land Company Ltd. The railway and the townsite of Gledhow were purchased by the state government in 1896 and the townsite was gazetted in 1898. it is most likely named after Gledhow in Yorkshire.
