= Frenchman Bay, Western Australia =

Locality in the City of Albany, Western Australia

Frenchman Bay
- other
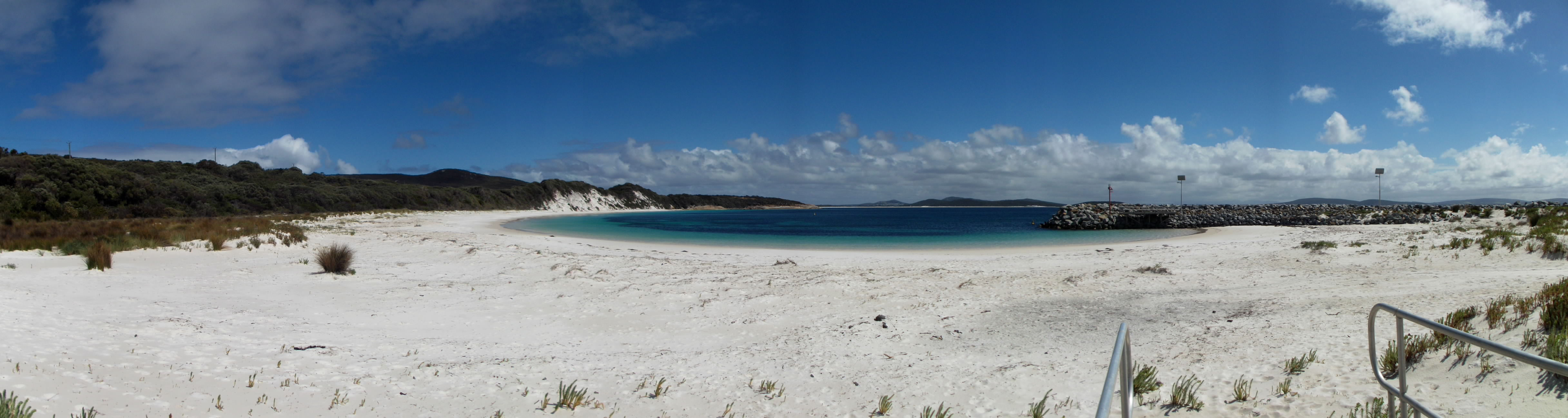

- Coordinates: 35°5′37″S 117°56′59″E
- Country: Australia
- State: Western Australia
- LGA: City of Albany

Government
  - State electorate: Albany
  - Federal division: O'Connor

Area
  - Total: 0.6 km^{2} (0.23 sq mi)
- Postcode: 6330

Frenchman Bay is a locality of the City of Albany in the Great Southern region of Western Australia. It is located just west of the historic Cheyne Beach Whaling Station. It is approximately 9.1 km (5.7 mi) from Albany on the opposite side of the bay.

== History ==
The site is in the traditional settlement area of the Menang Aboriginal tribe.

Frenchman Bay, first named in 1887, has been a significant site in the recent history of the entire region. George Vancouver, the first European explorer of King George Sound, landed here in 1791. A water source at Whalers Beach was subsequently visited again and again by seafarers. The water supply later enabled the establishment of whaling stations and was a destination for day trippers and tourists. Just north of what is now Goode Beach, a settler settled for the first time on the peninsula. Later a hostel and a campsite were built.

Originally, the name Frenchman Bay referred to a larger area that also included Goode Beach and the Vancouver Peninsula to the north. In 2000, Vancouver Peninsula was split from Frenchman Bay.
