= Lange, Western Australia =

Suburb of the City of Albany, Western Australia

Lange
- Suburb
- Interactive map of Lange
- Coordinates: 34°59′38″S 117°53′13″E
- Country: Australia
- State: Western Australia
- City: Albany
- LGA: City of Albany
- Location: 3.6 km (2.2 mi) from Albany

Government
  - State electorate: Albany
  - Federal division: O'Connor

Area
  - Total: 3.7 km^{2} (1.4 sq mi)

Population
  - Total: 394 (SAL 2021)
- Postcode: 6330
Suburbs around Lange
Milpara	Walmsley	Bayonet Head
Milpara	Lange	Collingwood Heights
Orana	Yakamia	Collingwood Heights

Lange is a northern suburb of the City of Albany in the Great Southern region of Western Australia. The population of the suburb has a median age of 39 years.
