= Marbelup, Western Australia =

Town in the City of Albany, Western Australia

Marbelup
- Town
- Coordinates: 34.98119°S 117.72967°E
- Country: Australia
- State: Western Australia
- LGA: City of Albany
- Location: 378 km (235 mi) SE of Perth; 33 km (21 mi) E of Denmark; 16 km (9.9 mi) W of Albany
- Established: 1900

Government
  - State electorate: Albany
  - Federal division: O'Connor

Area
  - Total: 61.2 km^{2} (23.6 sq mi)

Population
  - Total: 487 (SAL 2021)
- Postcode: 6330
Localities around Marbelup
Redmond	Drome	McKail
Torbay	Marbelup	Gledhow
Elleker	Cuthbert	Gledhow

Marbelup is a townsite and locality of the City of Albany in the Great Southern region of Western Australia. The South Coast Highway runs through the locality west to east while the Great Southern Railway passes through it from north to south. The Marbelup Nature Reserve surrounds the remaining gazetted townsite, 4,052 square metres (43,620 sq ft) in size, on three sides but no town actually exists at location.

== History ==
Marbelup is on the traditional land of the Minang people of the Noongar nation.

Marbellup was established as a station on the Great Southern Railway when the line opened in 1899. A small area of land was privately surveyed by the W A Land Company, who built the railway line, but little land was sold by the time the line was purchased by the Western Australian government in 1896. The government set aside land for a townsite in 1899 and gazetted Marbellup as a town in August 1900. The town never developed, with only one lot ever sold. The origin of the town's name is Aboriginal, but the meaning is unknown.

The railway siding at Marbelup and Marbelup Cottage are on the City of Albany's heritage register. Marbelup Cottage, dating back to 1865, belonged to David Young but, despite its name, is located near the Wilson Inlet at Youngs Siding, and not within the current locality of Marbelup.

== Nature reserve ==
The Marbelup Nature Reserve was gazetted on 12 March 1958, has a size of 1.04 square kilometres (0.40 sq mi), and is located within the Jarrah Forest bioregion.
