= Port Albany, Western Australia =

Suburb of the City of Albany, Western Australia

Port Albany
- Suburb
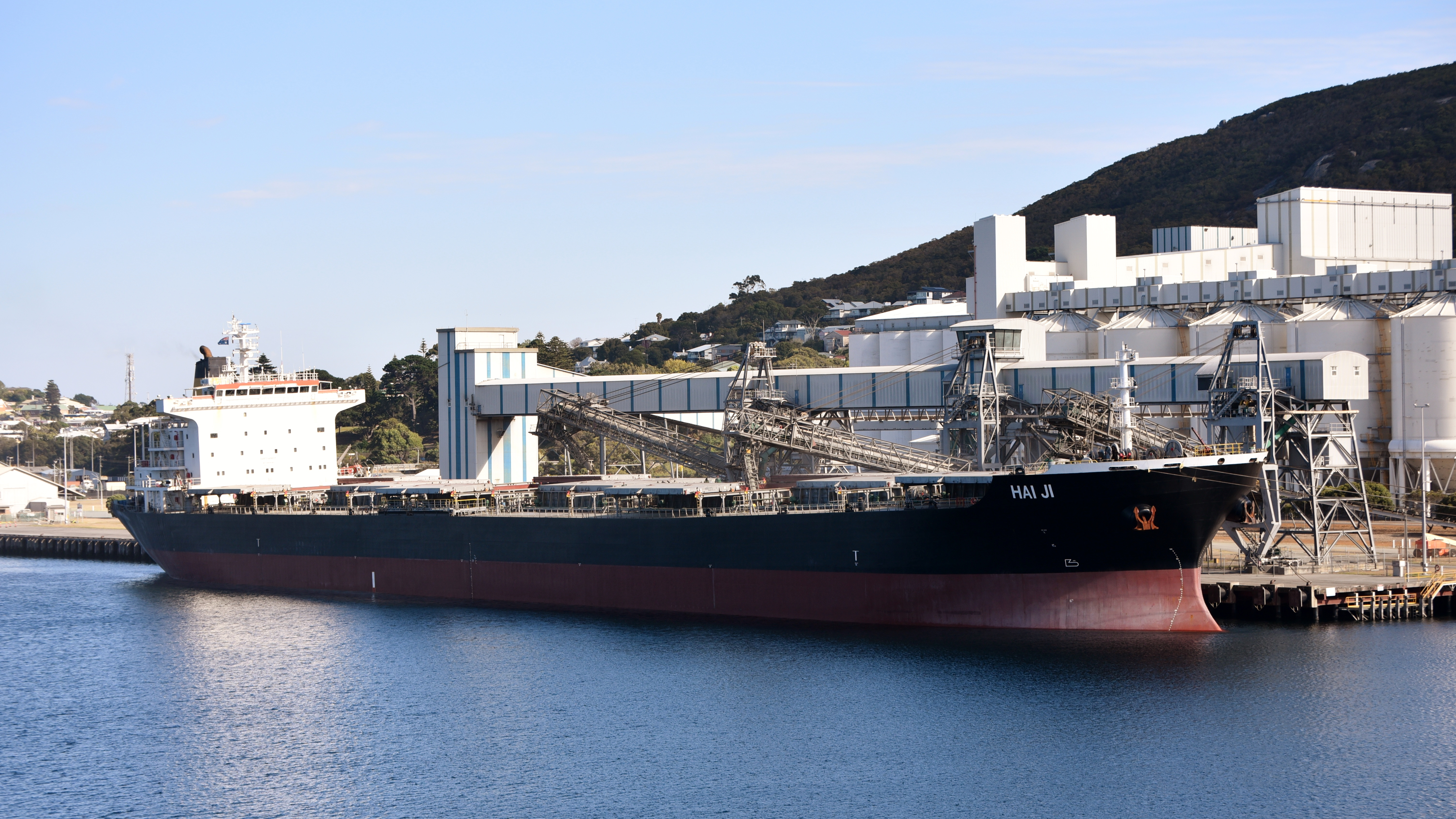
- The bulk carrier Hai Ji berthed at the Port of Albany

- Coordinates: 35.03092°S 117.90032°E
- Country: Australia
- State: Western Australia
- LGA: City of Albany

Government
  - State electorate: Albany
  - Federal division: O'Connor

Area
  - Total: 1.8 km^{2} (0.69 sq mi)

Population
  - Total: 133 (SAL 2021)
- Postcode: 6330
Suburbs around Port Albany
Mount Clarence	Mount Clarence	Middleton Beach
Albany	Port Albany	King George Sound
	Princess Royal Harbour	Ataturk Channel

Port Albany is a suburb of the City of Albany in the Great Southern region of Western Australia. The suburb is bounded by the Princess Royal Harbour to the south and King George Sound to the east and is home to the Port of Albany. To the south of Port Albany, the Ataturk Channel, which connects Princess Royal Harbour with King George Sound, separates it from Vancouver Peninsula.

The suburb is on the traditional land of the Minang people of the Noongar nation.

The area backing on to Mount Clarence, along Brunswick Road, contains five heritage listed houses and the also heritage listed Mass Rocks and Lookout Rocks.
