= Yakamia, Western Australia =

Suburb of the City of Albany, Western Australia

Yakamia
- Suburb
- Interactive map of Yakamia
- Coordinates: 35.004°S 117.878°E
- Country: Australia
- State: Western Australia
- City: Albany
- LGA: City of Albany
- Location: 2 km (1.2 mi) NE of Albany

Government
  - State electorate: Albany
  - Federal division: O'Connor

Area
  - Total: 3.3 km^{2} (1.3 sq mi)

Population
  - Total: 3,025 (SAL 2021)
- Postcode: 6330
Suburbs around Yakamia
Milpara	Lange	Collingwood Heights
Orana	Yakamia	Spencer Park
Mount Melville	Centennial Park	Mira Mar

Yakamia is an inner suburb of Albany. The suburb was created in the 1970s, and was gazetted in 1979. The name is believed to be a Noongar word meaning "sister to a small creek".

== Geography ==
Yakamia is bounded by North Road to the south, Chester Pass Road to the west, Hudson and Bond Roads to the north and Ulster Road to the southeast. Yakamia Creek runs through the suburb.

== Facilities ==
Yakamia is a residential suburb, and used to consist primarily of bushland, however, this has slowly disappeared with the bush making way for new housing developments. The suburb contains Yakamia Primary School, which opened in 1970 and now has around 620 students. There is also a small shopping centre on North Road. The City of Albany's council offices are located in Yakamia along North Road.
