= McKail, Western Australia =

Suburb of the City of Albany, Western Australia

McKail
- Suburb
- Interactive map of McKail
- Coordinates: 34°59′53″S 117°49′30″E
- Country: Australia
- State: Western Australia
- City: Albany
- LGA: City of Albany

Government
  - State electorate: Albany
  - Federal division: O'Connor

Area
  - Total: 9.9 km^{2} (3.8 sq mi)

Population
  - Total: 3,970 (SAL 2021)
- Postcode: 6330
Suburbs around McKail
Marbelup	Warrenup	Warrenup
Marbelup	McKail	Milpara
Gledhow	Gledhow	Lockyer

McKail is a north-western is a suburb of the City of Albany in the Great Southern region of Western Australia.

McKail was named after John McKail who in 1835 wrongly killed Whadjuk Noongar Goggalee and was forced to leave the Swan River settlement.
