= Bornholm, Western Australia =

Locality in the City of Albany, Western Australia

Bornholm
- Interactive map of Bornholm
- Coordinates: 35.054°S 117.571°E
- Country: Australia
- State: Western Australia
- LGA: Albany
- Location: 436 km (271 mi) SSE of Perth; 26 km (16 mi) W of Albany

Government
  - State electorate: Albany
  - Federal division: O'Connor

Area
  - Total: 32.6 km^{2} (12.6 sq mi)
- Elevation: 59 m (194 ft)

Population
  - Total: 110 (SAL 2021)
- Postcode: 6330

Bornholm is a locality of the City of Albany in the Great Southern region of Western Australia. The coastal region of the locality, facing the Southern Ocean, is covered by the West Cape Howe National Park. It is located between Albany and Denmark on the Lower Denmark Road.

Situated along the railway between Albany and Denmark, the town formed around the railway siding. The surrounding area has been allocated into many small farms with areas mostly between 30 and 100 acres. Mixed farming predominates the area with fruits, vegetables and raising stock being commonplace. The area had been settled prior to 1912. The local timber mill had been utilized for making of the Great Southern Railway. In 1923 the Bornholm Hall was officially opened by John Scaddan, the MLA for Albany.

In 2010, the community was menaced by a bushfire that burnt through 12 hectares (30 acres) of bushland near the beach, closing parts of the Bibbulmun Track. The fire was contained the following day.
