= Kojaneerup South, Western Australia =

Locality in the City of Albany, Western Australia

Kojaneerup South
- other
- Coordinates: 34°30′11″S 118°22′22″E
- Country: Australia
- State: Western Australia
- LGA: City of Albany

Government
  - State electorate: Albany
  - Federal division: O'Connor

Area
  - Total: 315.7 km^{2} (121.9 sq mi)

Population
  - Total: 23 (2021)
  - Density: 0.0729/km^{2} (0.189/sq mi)
- Postcode: 6328

Kojaneerup South is a locality of the City of Albany in the Great Southern region of Western Australia. A small section of the Stirling Range National Park is located within Kojaneerup South.

== Demographics ==
As of the 2021 Australian census, 23 people resided in Kojaneerup South, down from 38 in the 2016 census. In the latter census, the median age of persons in Kojaneerup South was 38 years. There were fewer males than females, with 44.4% of the population male and 55.6% female. The average household size was 3.4 people per household.
