= City of Albany =

Coordinates: 35°01′22″S 117°52′53″E

- Local government area
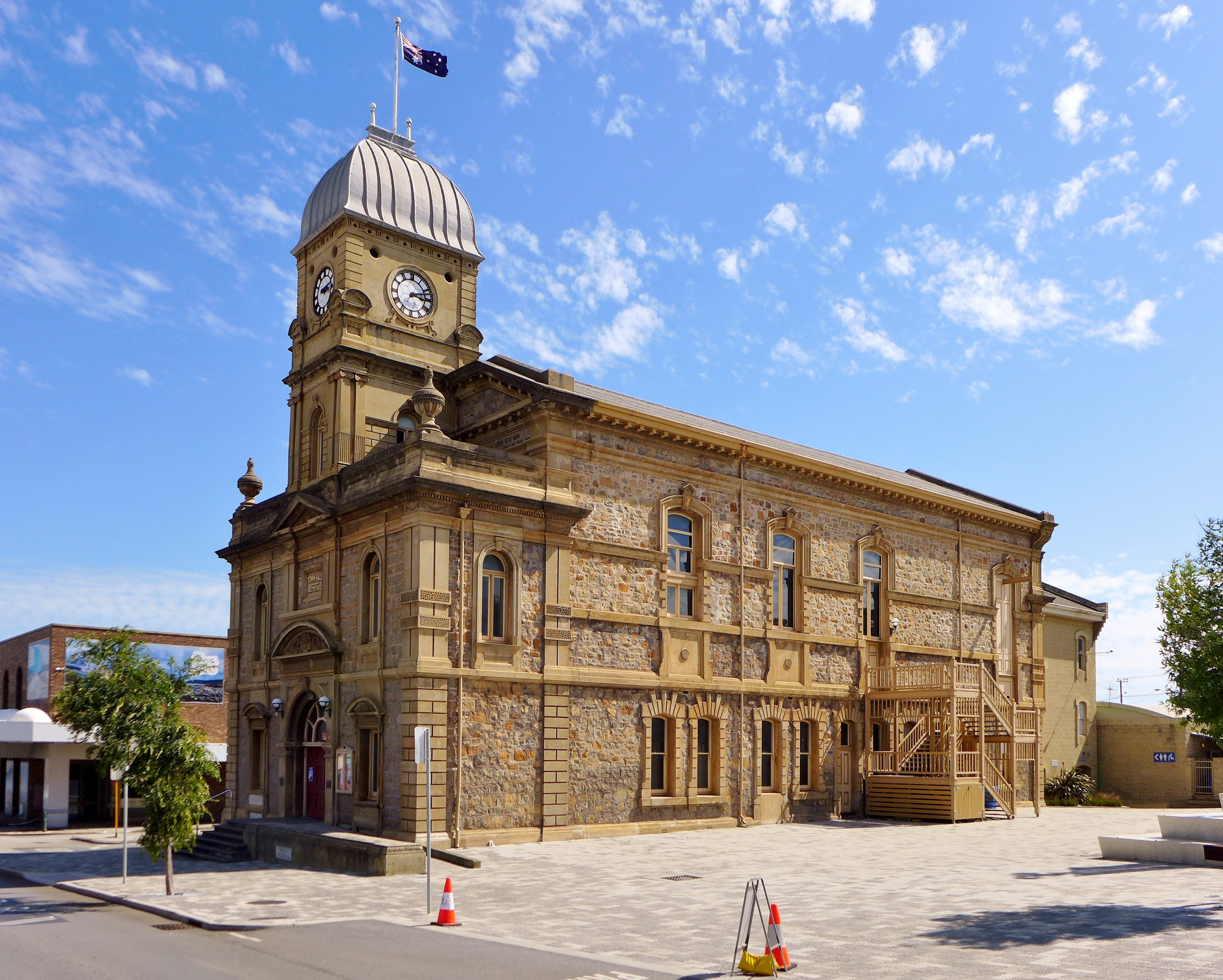
- The Albany Town Hall

- Interactive map of City of Albany
- Country: Australia
- State: Western Australia
- Region: Great Southern
- Established: 1998
- Council seat: Albany

Government
  - Mayor: Greg Stocks
  - State electorate: Albany
  - Federal division: O'Connor

Area
  - Total: 4,312.3 km^{2} (1,665.0 sq mi)

Population
  - Total: 38,763 (LGA 2021)
  - Density: 8.99/km^{2} (23.3/sq mi)
- Website: City of Albany
LGAs around City of Albany
| Plantagenet | Gnowangerup | Jerramungup |
| Denmark | City of Albany | Southern Ocean |
| Southern Ocean | Southern Ocean | Southern Ocean |

The City of Albany is a local government area in the Great Southern region of Western Australia, about 410 kilometres (255 mi) south-southeast of Perth, the capital of Western Australia. It covers an area of 4,312.3 square kilometres (1,665 sq mi), including the Greater Albany metropolitan area and the Port of Albany, as well as the surrounding agricultural district and some national parks. The City of Albany had a population of over 36,000 at the 2016 census.

== History ==
The Municipality of Albany was gazetted in 1871. It was initially headed by a chairman, with William Finlay becoming the first mayor in 1885.

The Albany Road Board was gazetted in 1896. On 1 July 1961, they became respectively the Town of Albany and Shire of Albany councils following changes to the Local Government Act.

The City of Albany was established on 1 July 1998 with the amalgamation of the Town of Albany and the Shire of Albany.

A new administration building and Civic Centre was constructed and opened in 2005 on North Road.

== Indigenous people ==
The City of Albany is located on the traditional land of the Minang people of the Noongar nation.

== Mayors ==
See also List of mayors of Albany, Western Australia

Alison Goode was mayor from 1999 until 2007. Milton Evans was elected mayor in 2007. Evans served until elections in 2011; he was defeated by Dennis Wellington in that year. Dennis Wellington was elected mayor for a second time in 2015. Wellington was re-elected again in 2019, and served as mayor until 2023. Greg Stocks is the current mayor. He was elected in October 2023.

== Wards ==
The city has been divided into six wards, each of two councillors. Each councillor serves a four-year term, and half-elections are held every two years. The mayor is directly elected.

Albany's six wards are as follows:

- Breaksea
- Frederickstown (central Albany)
- Kalgan
- Vancouver
- West
- Yakamia

=== 2023 election results ===
2023 Western Australian local elections: Albany
| Party | Candidate | Votes | % | ±% |
|---|---|---|---|---|
| Independent | Paul Terry (elected) | 1,582 | 14.18 | |
| Independent | Mario Lionetti (elected) | 1,422 | 12.74 | |
| Independent | Craig McKinley (elected) | 1,268 | 11.36 | |
| Independent | Chris Thomson | 1,108 | 9.93 | |
| Independent National | Rod Pfeiffer | 1,101 | 9.87 | |
| Independent Greens | Lynn MacLaren (elected) | 1,099 | 9.85 | |
| Independent Labor | Matt Benson-Lidholm | 999 | 8.95 | |
| Independent | Jennifer McRae | 970 | 8.69 | |
| Independent | Lindsay Dean | 598 | 5.36 | |
| Independent | John Shanhun | 552 | 4.95 | |
| Independent | Jon Doust | 460 | 4.12 | |
| Total formal votes | | 11,159 | 99.20 | |
| Informal votes | | 90 | 0.80 | |
| Turnout | | 11,249 | 38.65 | |

== Towns, suburbs and localities ==
The towns, suburbs and localities of the City of Albany with population and size figures based on the most recent Australian census:

| Locality | Population | Area | Map |
|---|---|---|---|
| Albany | 1,403 (SAL 2021) | 2.4 km^{2} (0.93 sq mi) | |
| Bayonet Head | 3,272 (SAL 2021) | 5.5 km^{2} (2.1 sq mi) | |
| Big Grove | 225 (SAL 2021) | 6.9 km^{2} (2.7 sq mi) | |
| Bornholm | 110 (SAL 2021) | 32.6 km^{2} (12.6 sq mi) | |
| Centennial Park | 689 (SAL 2021) | 2 km^{2} (0.77 sq mi) | |
| Cheynes | 37 (SAL 2021) | 180.2 km^{2} (69.6 sq mi) | |
| Collingwood Heights | 694 (SAL 2021) | 2.6 km^{2} (1.0 sq mi) | |
| Collingwood Park | 205 (SAL 2021) | 2.2 km^{2} (0.85 sq mi) | |
| Cuthbert | 157 (SAL 2021) | 6.9 km^{2} (2.7 sq mi) | |
| Drome | 52 (SAL 2021) | 49.7 km^{2} (19.2 sq mi) | |
| Elleker | 356 (SAL 2021) | 43.8 km^{2} (16.9 sq mi) | |
| Emu Point | 285 (SAL 2021) | 2 km^{2} (0.77 sq mi) | |
| Frenchman Bay | ^{[1]} | 0.6 km^{2} (0.23 sq mi) | |
| Gledhow | 1,079 (SAL 2021) | 6.6 km^{2} (2.5 sq mi) | |
| Gnowellen | 30 (SAL 2021) | 362.1 km^{2} (139.8 sq mi) | |
| Goode Beach | 258 (SAL 2021) | 1.2 km^{2} (0.46 sq mi) | |
| Green Range | 62 (SAL 2021) | 470.6 km^{2} (181.7 sq mi) | |
| Green Valley | 57 (SAL 2021) | 63.5 km^{2} (24.5 sq mi) | |
| Kalgan | 840 (SAL 2021) | 250 km^{2} (97 sq mi) | |
| King River | 278 (SAL 2021) | 15.8 km^{2} (6.1 sq mi) | |
| Kojaneerup South | 23 (SAL 2021) | 315.7 km^{2} (121.9 sq mi) | |
| Kronkup | 262 (SAL 2021) | 16.4 km^{2} (6.3 sq mi) | |
| Lange | 394 (SAL 2021) | 3.7 km^{2} (1.4 sq mi) | |
| Little Grove | 1,508 (SAL 2021) | 4 km^{2} (1.5 sq mi) | |
| Lockyer | 1,298 (SAL 2021) | 1.3 km^{2} (0.50 sq mi) | |
| Lower King | 1,890 (SAL 2021) | 11.7 km^{2} (4.5 sq mi) | |
| Lowlands | 149 (SAL 2021) | 39.8 km^{2} (15.4 sq mi) | |
| Manypeaks | 149 (SAL 2021) | 295.5 km^{2} (114.1 sq mi) | |
| Marbelup | 487 (SAL 2021) | 61.2 km^{2} (23.6 sq mi) | |
| McKail | 3,970 (SAL 2021) | 10 km^{2} (3.9 sq mi) | |
| Mettler | 35 (SAL 2021) | 244.5 km^{2} (94.4 sq mi) | |
| Middleton Beach | 759 (SAL 2021) | 0.8 km^{2} (0.31 sq mi) | |
| Millbrook | 284 (SAL 2021) | 19.2 km^{2} (7.4 sq mi) | |
| Milpara | 953 (SAL 2021) | 2.1 km^{2} (0.81 sq mi) | |
| Mira Mar | 1,890 (SAL 2021) | 1.5 km^{2} (0.58 sq mi) | |
| Mount Clarence | 728 (SAL 2021) | 2.5 km^{2} (0.97 sq mi) | |
| Mount Elphinstone | 82 (SAL 2021) | 2.5 km^{2} (0.97 sq mi) | |
| Mount Melville | 1,007 (SAL 2021) | 2.9 km^{2} (1.1 sq mi) | |
| Nanarup | 38 (SAL 2021) | 71.9 km^{2} (27.8 sq mi) | |
| Napier | 269 (SAL 2021) | 265 km^{2} (102 sq mi) | |
| Nullaki | 32 (SAL 2021) | 30.1 km^{2} (11.6 sq mi) | |
| Orana | 2,035 (SAL 2021) | 2.4 km^{2} (0.93 sq mi) | |
| Palmdale | 18 (SAL 2021) | 158.2 km^{2} (61.1 sq mi) | |
| Port Albany | 133 (SAL 2021) | 1.8 km^{2} (0.69 sq mi) | |
| Redmond | 208 (SAL 2021) | 121.4 km^{2} (46.9 sq mi) | |
| Redmond West | 58 (SAL 2021) | 151 km^{2} (58 sq mi) | |
| Robinson | 696 (SAL 2021) | 11.7 km^{2} (4.5 sq mi) | |
| Sandpatch | 0 (SAL 2016) | 23.2 km^{2} (9.0 sq mi) | |
| Seppings | 177 (SAL 2021) | 1.6 km^{2} (0.62 sq mi) | |
| South Stirling | 22 (SAL 2021) | 148.4 km^{2} (57.3 sq mi) | |
| Spencer Park | 3,445 (SAL 2021) | 2.2 km^{2} (0.85 sq mi) | |
| Torbay | 378 (SAL 2021) | 21.5 km^{2} (8.3 sq mi) | |
| Torndirrup | 395 (SAL 2021) | 50.5 km^{2} (19.5 sq mi) | |
| Vancouver Peninsula | 4 (SAL 2021) | 3.8 km^{2} (1.5 sq mi) | |
| Walmsley | 47 (SAL 2021) | 10.6 km^{2} (4.1 sq mi) | |
| Warrenup | 800 (SAL 2021) | 7.8 km^{2} (3.0 sq mi) | |
| Wellstead | 78 (SAL 2021) | 432.4 km^{2} (167.0 sq mi) | |
| West Cape Howe | 5 (SAL 2021) | 24.9 km^{2} (9.6 sq mi) | |
| Willyung | 635 (SAL 2021) | 36.2 km^{2} (14.0 sq mi) | |
| Yakamia | 3,025 (SAL 2021) | 3.3 km^{2} (1.3 sq mi) | |
| Youngs Siding | 314 (SAL 2021) | 116 km^{2} (45 sq mi) | |

- ^[1] For the purpose of the 2021 Australian census, Frenchman Bay was counted as part of Torndirrup.

== Heritage-listed places ==
As of 2023, 471 places are heritage-listed in the City of Albany, of which 95 are on the State Register of Heritage Places.

== National Parks and Reserves ==
- Bakers Junction Nature Reserve
- Bald Island Nature Reserve
- Gull Rock National Park
- Mill Brook Nature Reserve
- North and South Sister Nature Reserves
- Tinkelelup Nature Reserve
- Torndirrup National Park
- Two Peoples Bay Nature Reserve
- Waychinicup National Park
- West Cape Howe National Park
