= Green Range, Western Australia =

Locality in the City of Albany, Western Australia

Green Range Western Australia
- Coordinates: 34°42′S 118°24′E
- Population: 62 (2021)
  - Density: 0.1317/km^{2} (0.3412/sq mi)
- Postcode(s): 6328
- Area: 470.6 km^{2} (181.7 sq mi)
- LGA(s): City of Albany
- State electorate(s): Albany
- Federal division(s): O'Connor

Green Range is a locality of the City of Albany in the Great Southern region of Western Australia, located along the Southern Ocean. The South Coast Highway runs through the locality from west to east.

== Demographics ==
As of the 2021 Australian census, 62 people resided in Green Range, down from 66 in the 2016 census. The median age of persons in Green Range was 37 years. There were more males than females, with 55.2% of the population male and 44.8% female. The average household size was 2.6 people per household.
