= Goode Beach, Western Australia =

Locality in the City of Albany, Western Australia

Goode Beach
- other
- Coordinates: 35°5′S 117°56′E
- Country: Australia
- State: Western Australia
- LGA: City of Albany
- Location: 435.9 km (270.9 mi) SE of Perth; 172.1 km (106.9 mi) SE of Kojonup; 21.8 km (13.5 mi) SE of Albany

Government
  - State electorate: Albany
  - Federal division: O'Connor

Area
  - Total: 3.8 km^{2} (1.5 sq mi)
- Elevation: 29 m (95 ft)

Population
  - Total: 258 (2021)
  - Density: 67.9/km^{2} (175.8/sq mi)
- Postcode: 6330

Goode Beach is a locality of the City of Albany in the Great Southern region of Western Australia. It borders the Torndirrup National Park to the south. It is located about 7.4 km (4.6 mi) from Albany on the other side of the bay.

== Demographics ==
As of the 2021 Australian census, 258 people resided in Goode Beach, up from 217 in the 2016 census. The median age of persons in Goode Beach was 63 years. There were fewer males than females, with 47.1% of the population male and 52.9% female. The average household size was 2 people per household.
