= Big Grove, Western Australia =

Locality in the City of Albany, Western Australia

Big Grove
- other
- Coordinates: 35°5′S 117°53′E
- Country: Australia
- State: Western Australia
- LGA: City of Albany
- Location: 426.2 km (264.8 mi) SE of Perth; 162.5 km (101.0 mi) SE of Kojonup; 12.2 km (7.6 mi) S of Albany

Government
  - State electorate: Albany
  - Federal division: O'Connor

Area
  - Total: 6.9 km^{2} (2.7 sq mi)

Population
  - Total: 225 (2021)
  - Density: 32.61/km^{2} (84.5/sq mi)
- Postcode: 6330

Big Grove is a locality of the City of Albany in the Great Southern region of Western Australia. It is located approximately 4.8 km (3.0 mi) from Albany across the bay.

The suburb is on the traditional land of the Minang people of the Noongar nation.

== Demographics ==
As of the 2021 Australian census, 225 people resided in Big Grove, up from 199 in the 2016 census. The median age of persons in Big Grove was 56 years. There were more males than females, with 59.6% of the population male and 40.4% female. The average household size was 1.9 people per household.
