= Orana, Western Australia =

Suburb of the City of Albany, Western Australia

Orana
- Suburb
- Interactive map of Orana
- Coordinates: 34°59′53″S 117°51′47″E
- Country: Australia
- State: Western Australia
- City: Albany
- LGA: City of Albany
- Location: 3.2 km (2.0 mi) from Albany

Government
  - State electorate: Albany
  - Federal division: O'Connor

Area
  - Total: 2.4 km^{2} (0.93 sq mi)

Population
  - Total: 2,035 (SAL 2021)
- Postcode: 6330
Suburbs around Orana
McKail	Milpara	Milpara
McKail	Orana	Yakamia
Gledhow	Lockyer	Centennial Park

Orana is a north-western suburb of Albany in southern Western Australia, northwest of Albany's central business district. Its local government area is the City of Albany.

It was gazetted as a suburb in 1979.

== Geography ==
The suburb is bounded in the north by Anson Road, to the south and east by the South Coast Highway and to the west by Le Grand Avenue. Albany Highway passes through the middle of the suburb.

== Education ==
The suburb contains North Albany Senior High School and Parklands School (Albany), a Montessori school.
