= North Albany Senior High School =

Public school in Albany, Western Australia

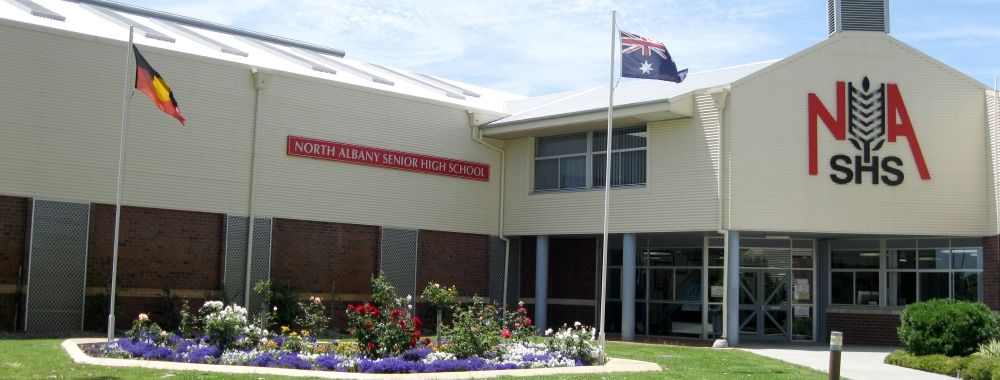

Location
- Orana; Western Australia; Australia; 34°59′26″S 117°51′46″E

Information
- Type: Public co-educational high day school
- Motto: Care and Diligence
- Established: 1982
- Principal: Peter Hurle
- Enrolment: 836 (2021)
- Campus: Albany
- Colours: Red, white, grey
- Website: nashs.wa.edu.au

North Albany Senior High School is a comprehensive public high school located in Orana, a north-western suburb of Albany, Western Australia, a regional centre 420 kilometres (261 mi) south-southeast of Perth.

== History ==
The school was established in 1982 and by 2016 the school had an enrolment of 749 students between Year 7 and Year 12, approximately 12% of whom were Indigenous. The 2019 enrollment was 804.

In 2013 the school appeared in the state's top 50 schools for WACE results for the first time in ten years, ranked at 28, turning around after a negative review in 2009.

In 2019 North Albany Senior High School ranked 82 in the WA school ranking and achieved high ATAR

In 2018 the state budget allocated funds for six new classrooms and eight refurbished rooms to help cater for growing enrolments.

== Programs ==
NASHS offers three key Aboriginal education programs - the Great Southern Clontarf Academy for young Aboriginal men, Rising Albany Yorgas (RAY) Program and the Deadly Sista Girlz program.

=== Clontarf Academy ===
The Great Southern Clontarf Academy was established in 2006, and is operated out of facilities at the school.

=== Trade Training Centre ===
In 2013, the school opened its Health Trade Training Centre, funded by the Rudd Government's Building the Education Revolution program. The $3.5 million facility is a simulated hospital and medical centre providing courses in nursing and allied health in collaboration with South Regional TAFE.

== See also ==
- List of schools in rural Western Australia
