= Vancouver Peninsula, Western Australia =

Locality in the City of Albany, Western Australia

Vancouver Peninsula
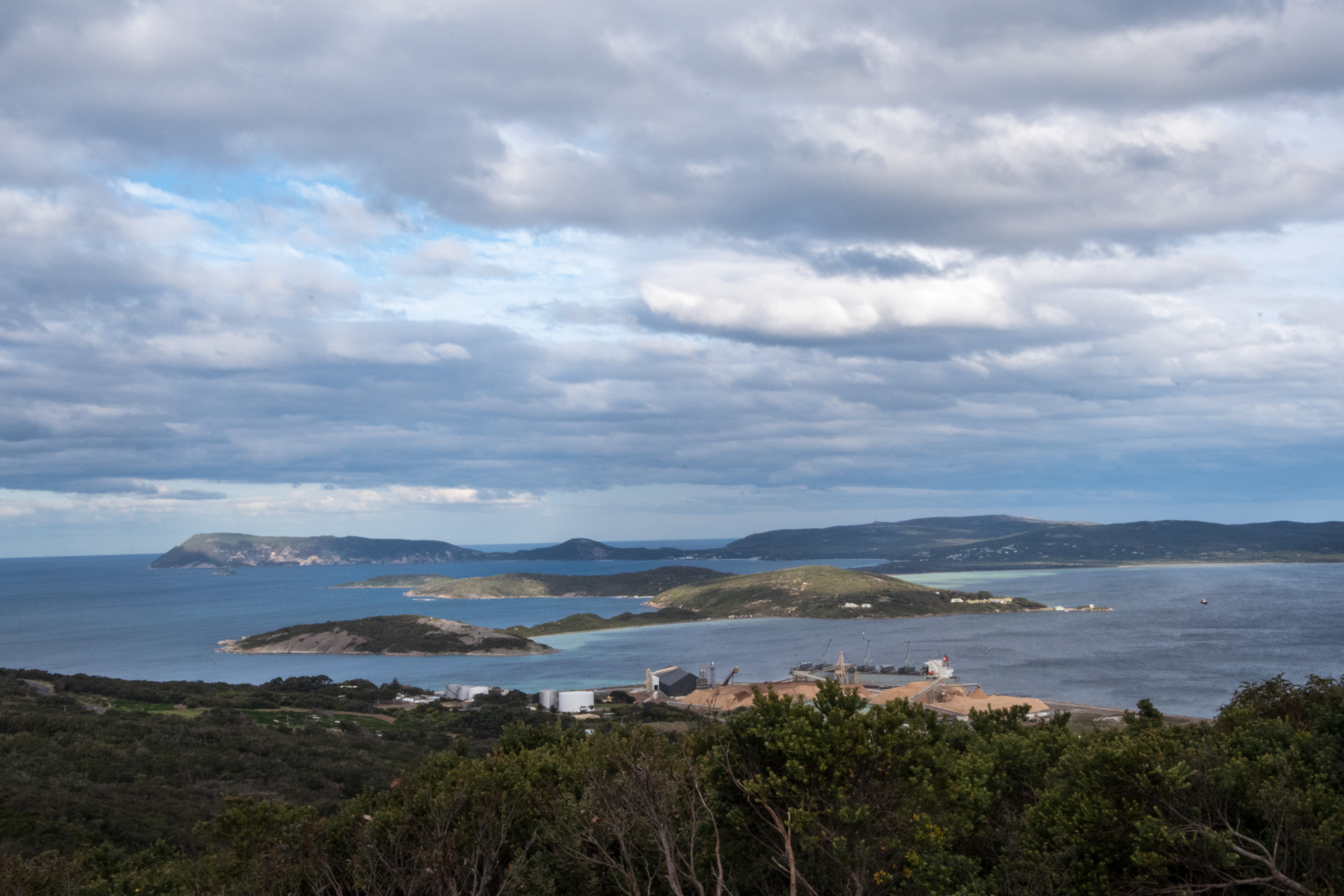

- Interactive map of Vancouver Peninsula
- Coordinates: 35°4′S 117°56′E
- Country: Australia
- State: Western Australia
- LGA: City of Albany
- Location: 431.4 km (268.1 mi) SE of Perth; 170.3 km (105.8 mi) SE of Kojonup; 20 km (12 mi) SE of Albany

Government
  - State electorate: Albany
  - Federal division: O'Connor

Area
  - Total: 3.8 km^{2} (1.5 sq mi)
- Elevation: 29 m (95 ft)

Population
  - Total: 4 (2021)
  - Density: 1.05/km^{2} (2.7/sq mi)
- Postcode: 6330

Vancouver Peninsula is a locality of the City of Albany in the Great Southern region of Western Australia. It is located about 5 kilometres (3.1 mi) from Albany on the other side of King George Sound. The only residential structure on the Vancouver Peninsula is Camp Quaranup at Geake Point.

Vancouver Peninsula is part of the traditional settlement area of the Menang Aboriginal people. The name refers to George Vancouver, a British officer, and explorer who was the first European to visit the bay in 1791. Originally, Vancouver Peninsula was part of Frenchman Bay from which it was split in 2000.

== Demographics ==
As of the 2021 Australian census, four people resided in Vancouver Peninsula, up from three in the 2016 census.
