= Mount Melville, Western Australia =

Suburb of the City of Albany, Western Australia

Mount Melville Kardarup (Nyungar) Albany, Western Australia
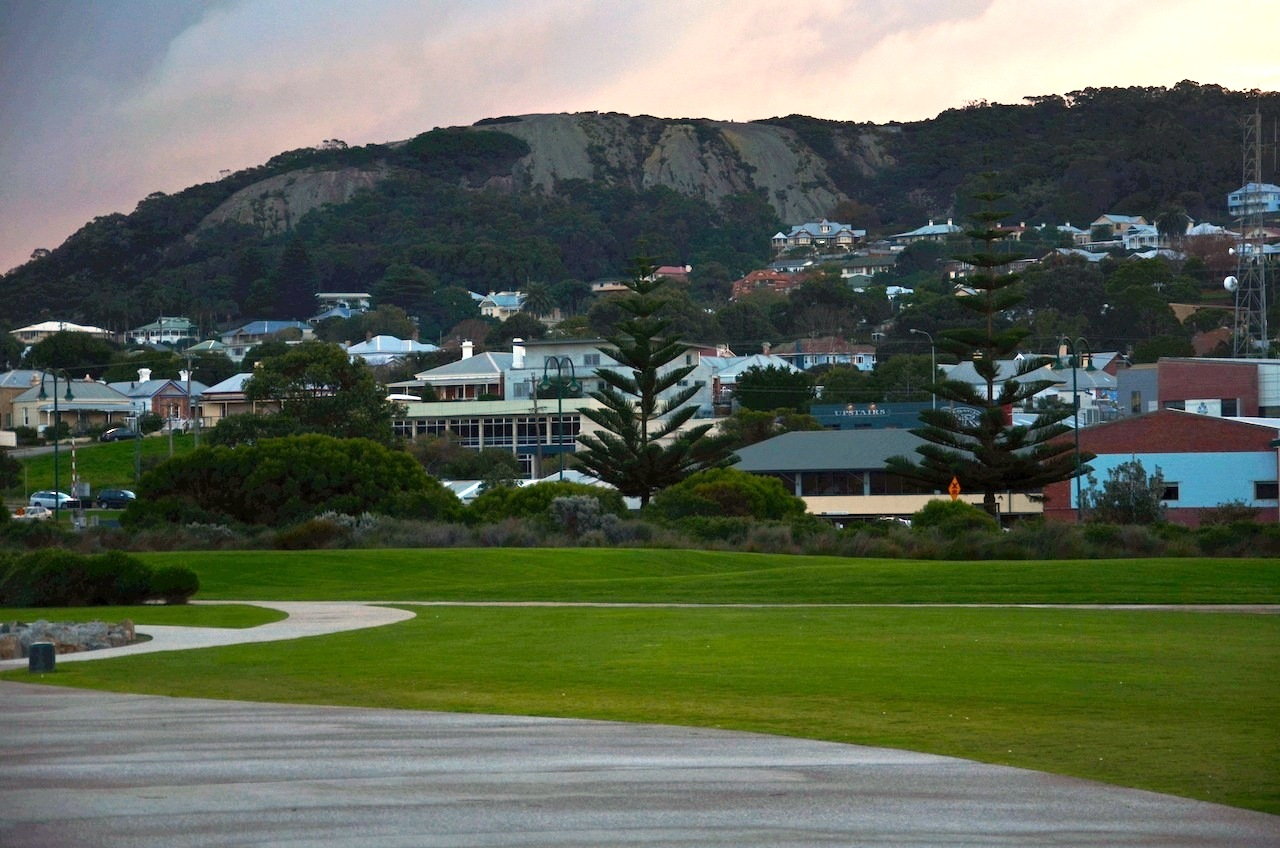
- Mount Melville from Anzac Park

- Coordinates: 35°01′21″S 117°52′16″E
- Population: 1,007 (SAL 2021)
- Postcode(s): 6330
- Area: 2.9 km^{2} (1.1 sq mi)
- LGA(s): City of Albany
- State electorate(s): Albany
- Federal division(s): O'Connor
Suburbs around Mount Melville:
Lockyer	Orana	Centennial Park
Mount Elphinstone	Mount Melville	Albany
Princess Royal Harbour	Princess Royal Harbour	Princess Royal Harbour

Kardarup/Mount Melville is a south-western suburb of Albany in southern Western Australia, west of Albany's central business district. Its local government area is the City of Albany.

Mount Melville is named after the natural granite massif that the suburb is nestled around. The mount forms the western flank to the Albany CBD, with Mount Clarence located to the eastern side.

The Mount was named after Viscount Melville, the first Lord of the Admiralty, in 1791 by Captain George Vancouver.

Mount Melville was gazetted as a suburb in 1979.

== Geography ==
The suburb is bounded by Albany Highway to the north and east, by Hanrahan Road to the west and by Princess Royal Harbour to the south.

It is set within native bush with walk trails and a sealed road to the top. A distinctive observation tower is situated at the peak that offers panoramic views as far as the Stirling Range to the north.

The mount has an elevation of 152 metres (499 ft).

The western side of Mount Melville is the site of the town's main waste management facility.
