= Centennial Park, Western Australia =

Inner suburb of Albany, Western Australia

Coordinates: 35°01′05″S 117°52′59″E

Centennial Park
- Suburb
- Interactive map of Centennial Park
- Country: Australia
- State: Western Australia
- City: Albany
- LGA: City of Albany
- Location: 2 km (1.2 mi) from Albany

Government
  - State electorate: Albany
  - Federal division: O'Connor

Area
  - Total: 2 km^{2} (0.77 sq mi)

Population
  - Total: 689 (SAL 2021)
- Postcode: 6330
Suburbs around Centennial Park
Orana	Yakamia	Spencer Park
Mt Melville	Centennial Park	Mira Mar
Mt Melville	Albany	Mt Clarence

Centennial Park is an inner suburb of Albany, Western Australia, immediately north of the CBD within the local government area of the City of Albany. It contains a light industrial area and numerous sporting facilities which serve the entire Albany catchment area.

It was gazetted as a suburb in 1979.

== Geography ==
Centennial Park is bounded by North Road to the north, Symers Street to the east, Middleton Road to the southeast and Albany Highway to the west and southwest. The lone residential area is nearest to Middleton Road and is only a few blocks in size, and contains some of Albany's oldest homes.

== Facilities ==
Centennial Park is primarily a service suburb, with a light industrial area in the centre of the suburb, and the Albany Regional Sporting Complex, Royals Football Club home ground Centennial Oval and Tigerland which hosts the Railways Football Club in the Great Southern Football League. Centennial Park Tigers Backyard Cricket Club are another sporting team in Centennial Park. Several motels and a caravan park operate along Albany Highway.

The area's shopping needs are served by Dog Rock Shopping Centre and Albany Shopping Plaza, both just beyond the southern boundary of the suburb between Middleton Road and Albany Highway, and by a small shopping centre on North Road.

== Transport ==
Centennial Park is located on three of Albany's major routes - Albany Highway, North Road and Middleton Road - and is served by several routes from Albany operated by Love's Bus Service.
