= King River, Western Australia =

Locality in the City of Albany, Western Australia

King River
- other
- Coordinates: 34°56′S 117°55′E
- Country: Australia
- State: Western Australia
- LGA: City of Albany
- Location: 406 km (252 mi) south east of Perth; 11 km (6.8 mi) north east of Albany

Government
  - State electorate: Albany
  - Federal division: O’Connor

Area
  - Total: 15.8 km^{2} (6.1 sq mi)

Population
  - Total: 278 (SAL 2021)
- Postcode: 6330

King River is a locality of the City of Albany in the Great Southern region of Western Australia. The South Coast Highway runs through the locality from south-west to north-east north of the King River, while forming its western border south of it. It is located 406 km south east of Perth and the closest populated town is Albany.

The town takes its name from the King River which is located nearby; another town, Lower King is further down river on Oyster Harbour.
