= Warrenup, Western Australia =

Locality in the City of Albany, Western Australia

Warrenup
- Interactive map of Warrenup
- Coordinates: 34°58′32″S 117°50′50″E
- Country: Australia
- State: Western Australia
- LGA: City of Albany

Government
  - State electorate: Albany
  - Federal division: O'Connor

Area
  - Total: 7.8 km^{2} (3.0 sq mi)

Population
  - Total: 800 (2021)
  - Density: 103/km^{2} (266/sq mi)
- Postcode: 6330

Warrenup is a locality of the City of Albany in the Great Southern region of Western Australia.

Part of Warrenup had been part of the land of the Hassell family.

== Demographics ==
As of the 2021 Australian census, 800 people resided in Warrenup, up from 701 in the 2016 census. The median age of persons in Warrenup was 43 years. There were fewer males than females, with 49.4% of the population male and 50.6% female. The average household size was 2.9 people per household.
