= Willyung, Western Australia =

Locality in the City of Albany, Western Australia

Willyung
- other
- Coordinates: 35°1′12.79″S 117°51′11.41″E
- Country: Australia
- State: Western Australia
- LGA: City of Albany
- Location: 416.7 km (258.9 mi) from Perth; 153 km (95 mi) from Kojonup; 13.2 km (8.2 mi) from Albany

Government
  - State electorate: Albany
  - Federal division: O'Connor

Area
  - Total: 36.2 km^{2} (14.0 sq mi)

Population
  - Total: 635 (2021)
  - Density: 17.54/km^{2} (45.43/sq mi)
- Postcode: 6330

Willyung is a locality of the City of Albany in the Great Southern region of Western Australia. Its south-western border is formed by the Albany Highway while Chester Pass Road forms its south-eastern one. It is located 13.2 km (8.2 mi) from Albany.

== Demographics ==
As of the 2021 Australian census, 635 people resided in Willyung, up from 575 in the 2016 census. The median age of persons in Willyung was 43 years. There were more males than females, with 50.5% of the population male and 49.5% female. The average household size was 2.8 people per household.
