= Mount Elphinstone, Western Australia =

Locality in the City of Albany, Western Australia

Mount Elphinstone
- other
- Coordinates: 35°1′12.79″S 117°51′11.41″E
- Country: Australia
- State: Western Australia
- LGA: City of Albany
- Location: 416.7 km (258.9 mi) from Perth; 152.9 km (95.0 mi) from Kojonup; 2.7 km (1.7 mi) from Albany

Government
  - State electorate: Albany
  - Federal division: O'Connor

Area
  - Total: 2.5 km^{2} (0.97 sq mi)

Population
  - Total: 82 (2021)
  - Density: 32.8/km^{2} (85.0/sq mi)
- Postcode: 6330

Mount Elphinstone is a locality of the City of Albany in the Great Southern region of Western Australia. It is located on Princess Royal Harbour, 2.7 km (1.7 mi) from Albany.

== Demographics ==
As of the 2021 Australian census, 82 people resided in Mount Elphinstone, down from 96 in the 2016 census. The median age of persons in Mount Elphinstone was 50 years. There were fewer males than females, with 49.4% of the population male and 50.6% female. The average household size was 2.3 people per household.
