= Lower King, Western Australia =

Town in the City of Albany, Western Australia

Lower King
- Town
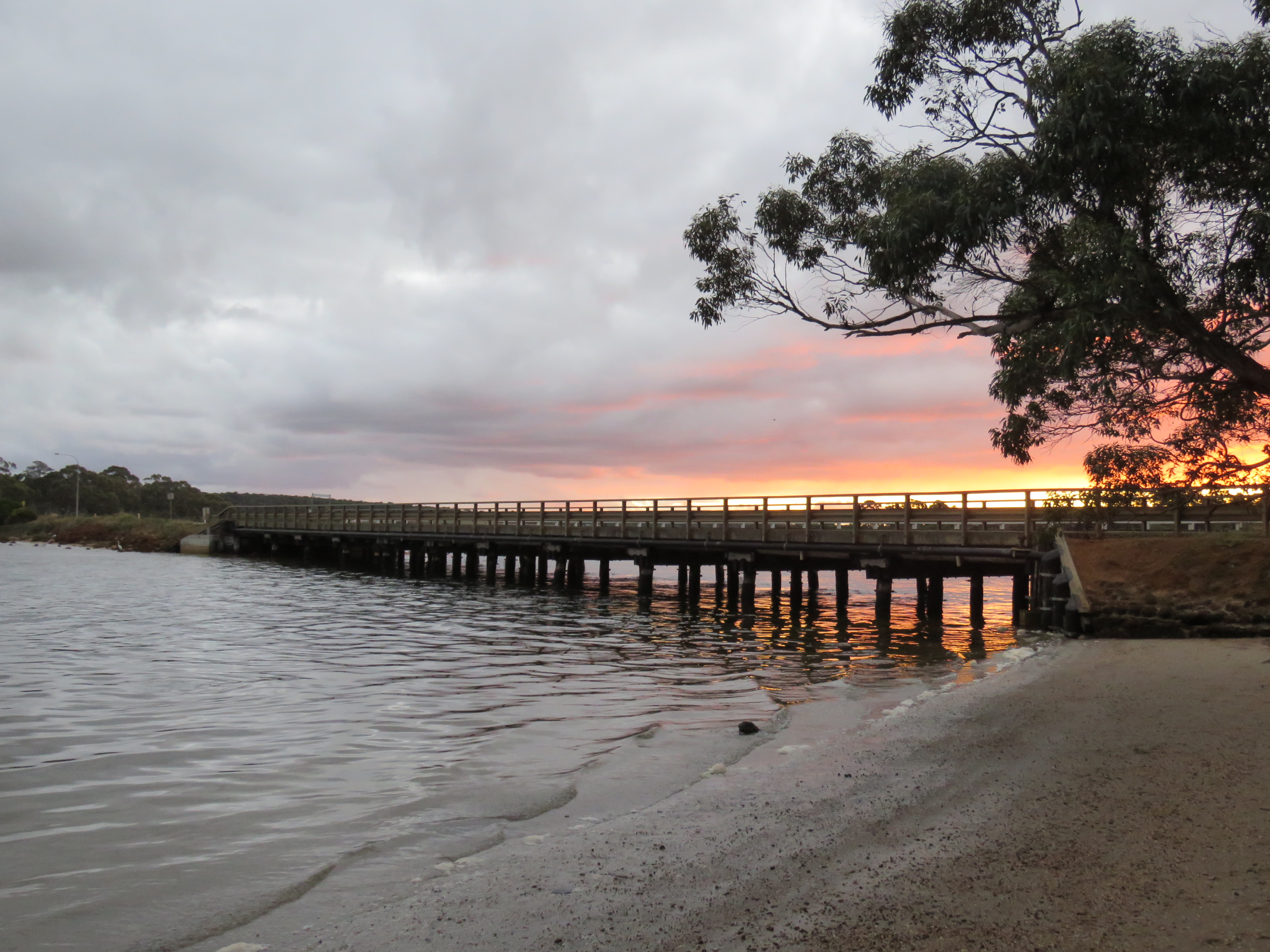
- The Lower King bridge over the King River in Lower King at sunset

- Coordinates: 34.96°S 117.93°E
- Country: Australia
- State: Western Australia
- LGA: City of Albany
- Location: 385 km (239 mi) south east of Perth; 8 km (5.0 mi) north east of Albany
- Established: 1959

Government
  - State electorate: Albany
  - Federal division: O'Connor

Area
  - Total: 11.7 km^{2} (4.5 sq mi)

Population
  - Total: 1,890 (SAL 2021)
- Postcode: 6330

Lower King is a town and locality of the City of Albany in the Great Southern region of Western Australia. It is located 385 km (239 mi) south-east of Perth; the closest populated town is Albany.

Located along the lower reaches of the King River on the western shore of Oyster Harbour, both the town and the river were named after Captain Philip Parker King, who first visited the area in 1818 aboard Mermaid.

The area around Lower King was a known haunt for sealers in 1831; it was settled in the 1830s with the townsite not being gazetted until 1959.

It had a population of 1604 in 2006, which increased to 1738 in 2011.
