= Wellstead, Western Australia =

Town in the City of Albany, Western Australia

Wellstead
- Town
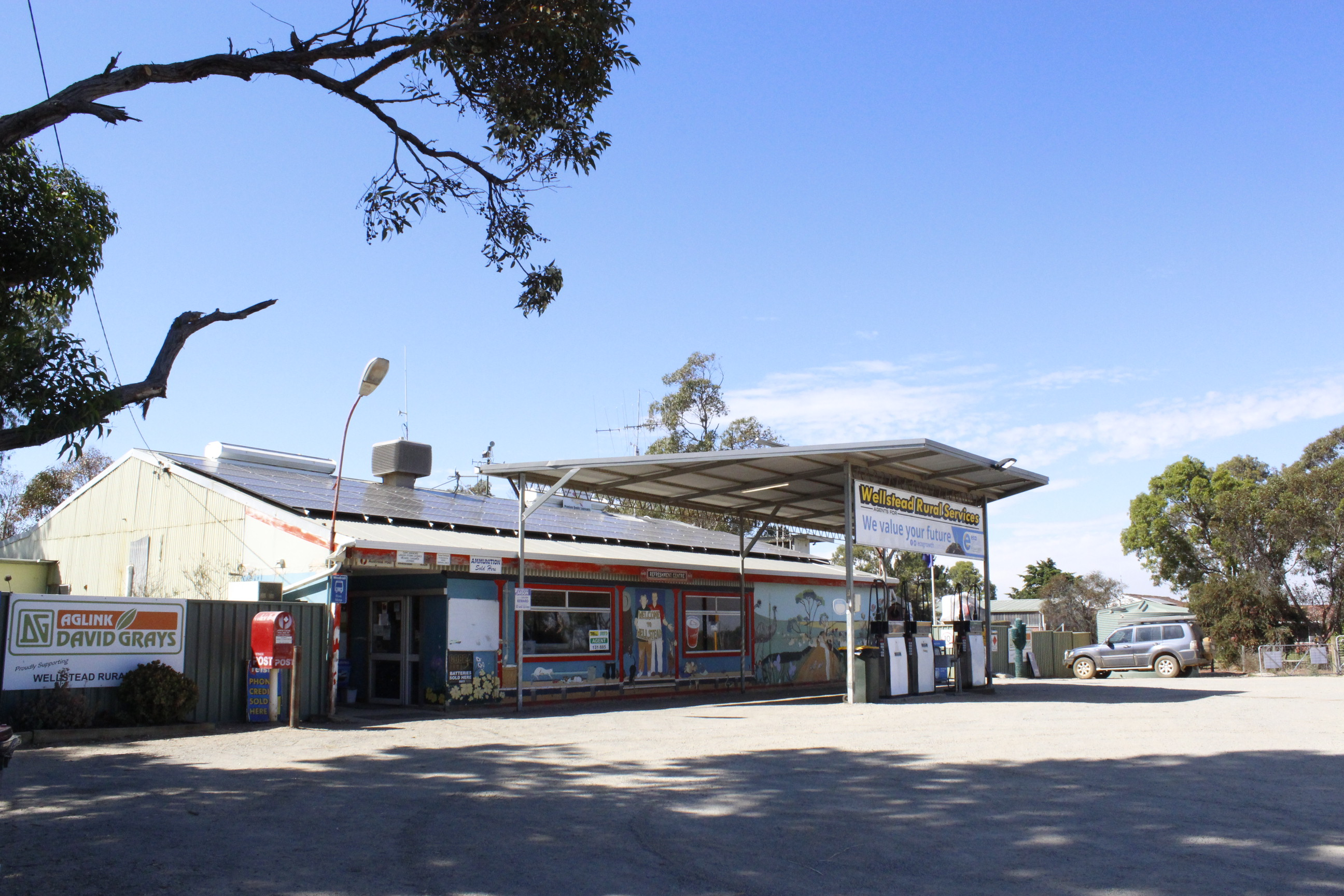
- Wellstead general store

- Interactive map of Wellstead
- Coordinates: 34°30′00″S 118°36′00″E
- Country: Australia
- State: Western Australia
- LGA: City of Albany
- Location: 476 km (296 mi) south east of Perth; 100 km (62 mi) north east of Albany; 80 km (50 mi) south of Jerramungup
- Established: 1965

Government
  - State electorate: Albany
  - Federal division: O'Connor

Area
  - Total: 432.4 km^{2} (167.0 sq mi)
- Elevation: 126 m (413 ft)

Population
  - Total: 78 (SAL 2021)
- Postcode: 6328

Wellstead is a small rural town and locality of the City of Albany in the Great Southern region of Western Australia. Located between Albany and Esperance, the locality stretches along the Indian Ocean coast, while the townsite is located inland, on the South Coast Highway.

The name commemorates the Wellstead family who settled in the area in 1860 and had held grazing land between Cape Riche (which is part of the locality) and Bremer Bay. Farmland was opened up in the area in the 1960s for cereal cropping and land was set aside for a town site. The town site was gazetted in 1965 shortly after establishing a telephone exchange.

John Wellstead still lived in the area in 1881 and sold 700 head of cattle via the market in Albany early the same year. He died in Albany in 1896 but his sons, including John Jr., continued the family pastoral interests in the area.

The surrounding areas produce wheat and other cereal crops. The town is a receival site for Cooperative Bulk Handling.
