= Mount Clarence, Western Australia =

Suburb of the City of Albany, Western Australia

Mount Clarence Corndarup (Nyungar) Albany, Western Australia
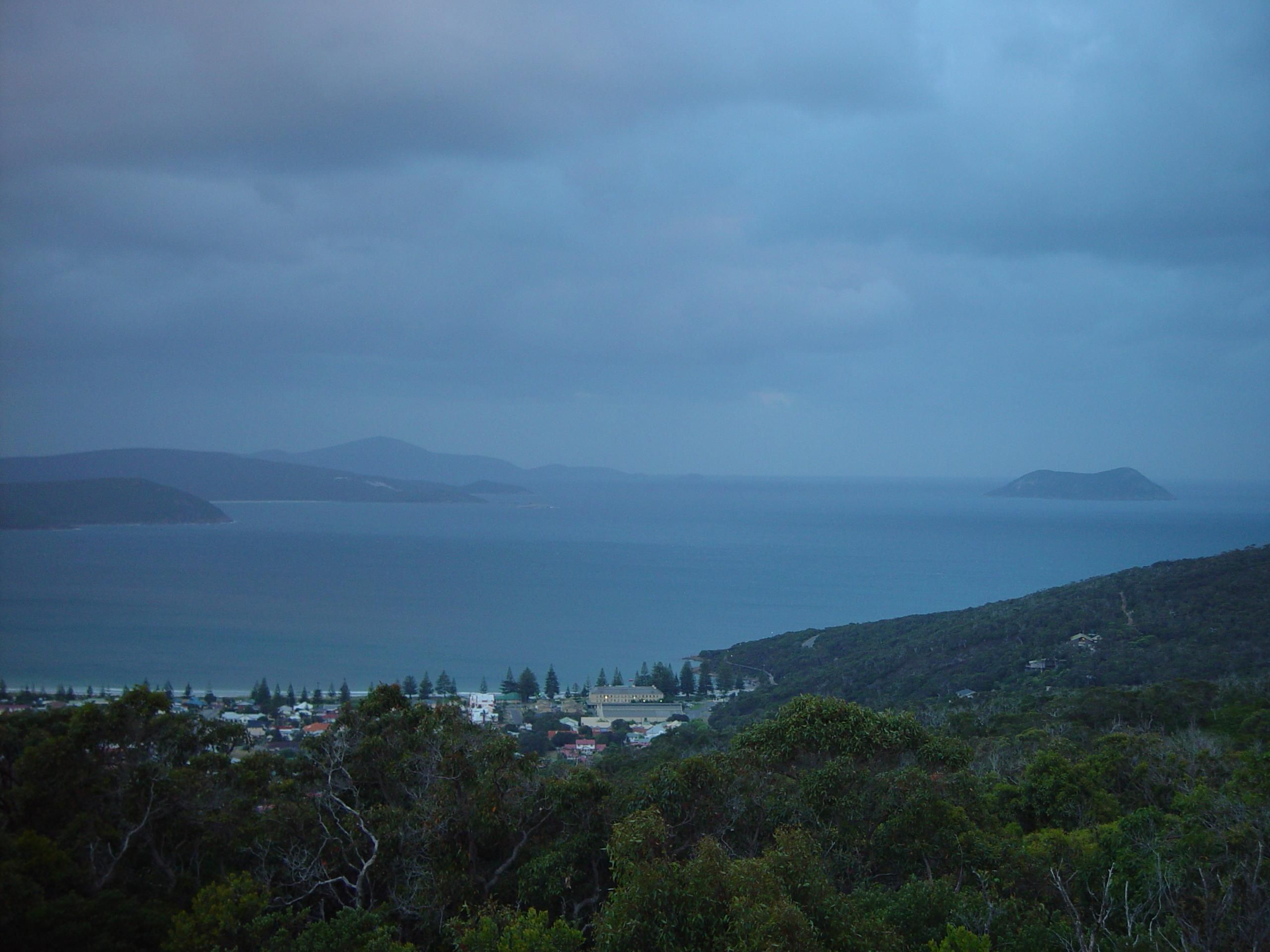
- King George Sound from Mount Clarence

- Coordinates: 35°01′30″S 117°53′38″E
- Population: 728 (SAL 2021)
- Postcode(s): 6330
- Area: 2.5 km^{2} (1.0 sq mi)
- Location: 2 km (1 mi) from Albany
- LGA(s): City of Albany
- State electorate(s): Albany
- Federal division(s): O'Connor
Suburbs around Mount Clarence:
Centennial Park	Mira Mar	Middleton Beach
Albany	Mount Clarence	Port Albany
Albany	Port Albany	Port Albany

Mount Clarence (Nyungar: Corndarup) is an inner suburb of Albany, Western Australia, between the Albany city centre and Middleton Beach. Its local government area is the City of Albany, and over three-quarters of its land area is either parkland or forest, including Albany's Heritage Park. Mount Clarence was gazetted as a suburb in 1979.

== Geography ==
Mount Clarence is bounded by Middleton Road to the north, Marine Drive to the east and south and the eastern boundary of Albany's town centre to the west. Most of the suburb's population of 669 is concentrated in the north and northwest of the suburb near Middleton Road.

== Desert Mounted Corps Memorial ==
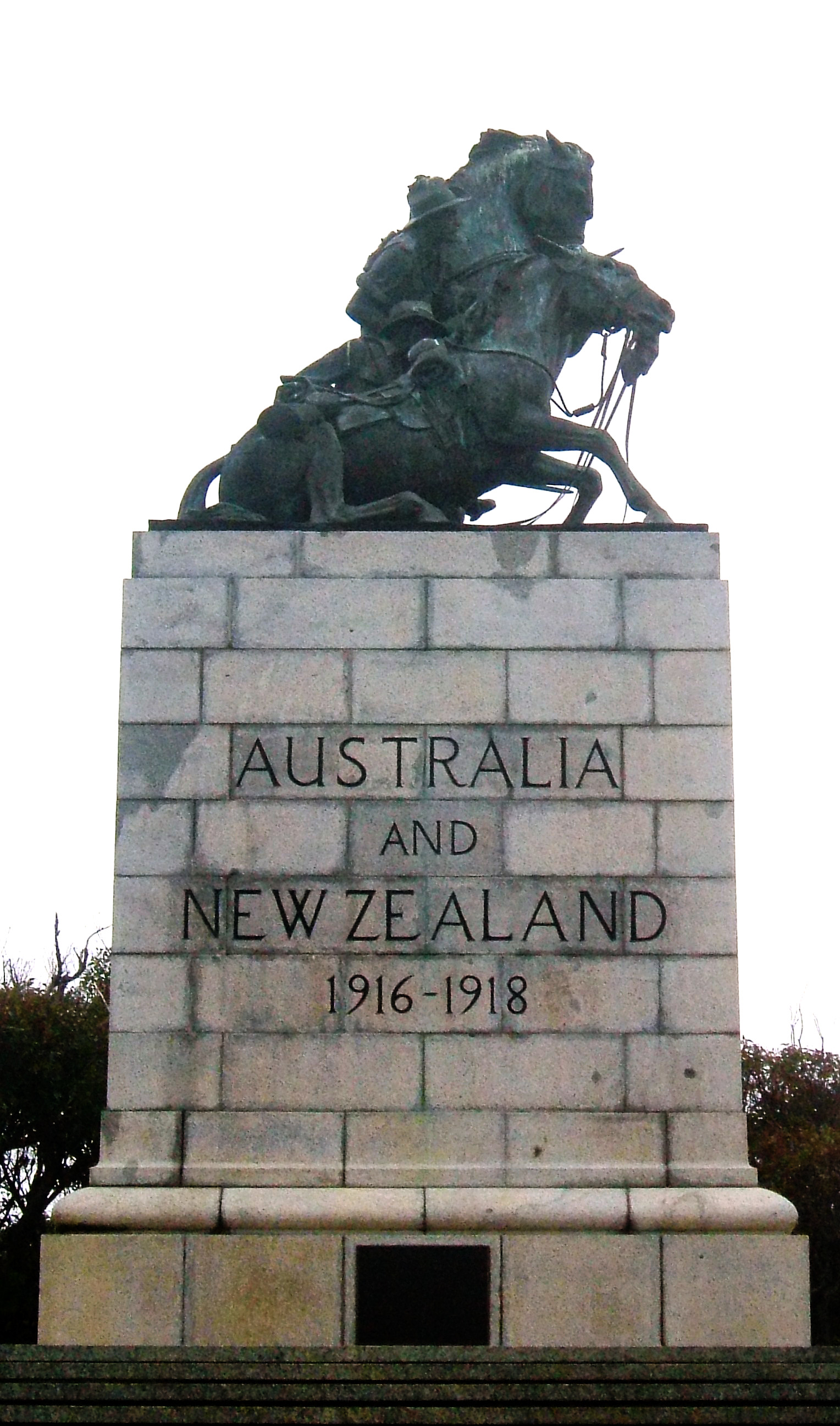
The Desert Mounted Corps Memorial

The Desert Mounted Corps Memorial stands near the summit of Mount Clarence. The memorial is a 9-metre bronze statue of an Australian mounted soldier assisting a New Zealand soldier whose horse has been wounded. The memorial was originally erected at Port Said, Egypt. In 1916, Brigadier General J.R. Royston, commander of the 3rd Australian Light Horse Brigade, suggested that a memorial be erected at Port Said in honour of Australian and New Zealand mounted soldiers killed in the Sinai and Palestine Campaign. The memorial was funded by the Australian and New Zealand Governments, and surviving mounted soldiers. It was erected in Port Said in 1932 and was inscribed to the memory of members of the Australian Light Horse, New Zealand Mounted Rifles Brigade and Imperial Camel Corps (all part of the Desert Mounted Corps) who died in Egypt, Palestine and Syria between 1916 and 1918. The memorial was damaged in anti-British riots during the Suez Crisis of 1956. In 1959, the United Arab Republic agreed to send the memorial back to Australia and it arrived in Albany in 1960. A copy of the statue was made and put on the original monument base and then erected on Mount Clarence in 1964. Another copy was erected on Anzac Parade in Canberra, as the Mounted Memorial.

Albany is associated with the Desert Mounted Corps in that the mounted troops and the rest of the first detachment of the Australian Imperial Force and the New Zealand Expeditionary Force (later known collectively as ANZACs) left Albany in a convoy of ships in November 1914 to join World War I.

Mount Clarence is the location of the annual ANZAC dawn service, first held in 1931 by Padre Arthur Ernest White. The location of the Albany ANZAC Day dawn service is atop mount Clarence at Padre White Lookout. The ANZAC Desert Mounted Corp Memorial faces east, into the rising sun.

== Facilities ==
Mount Clarence contains Albany Senior High School and the Pioneer Cemetery.
