= Menang =

Indigenous people of Western Australia

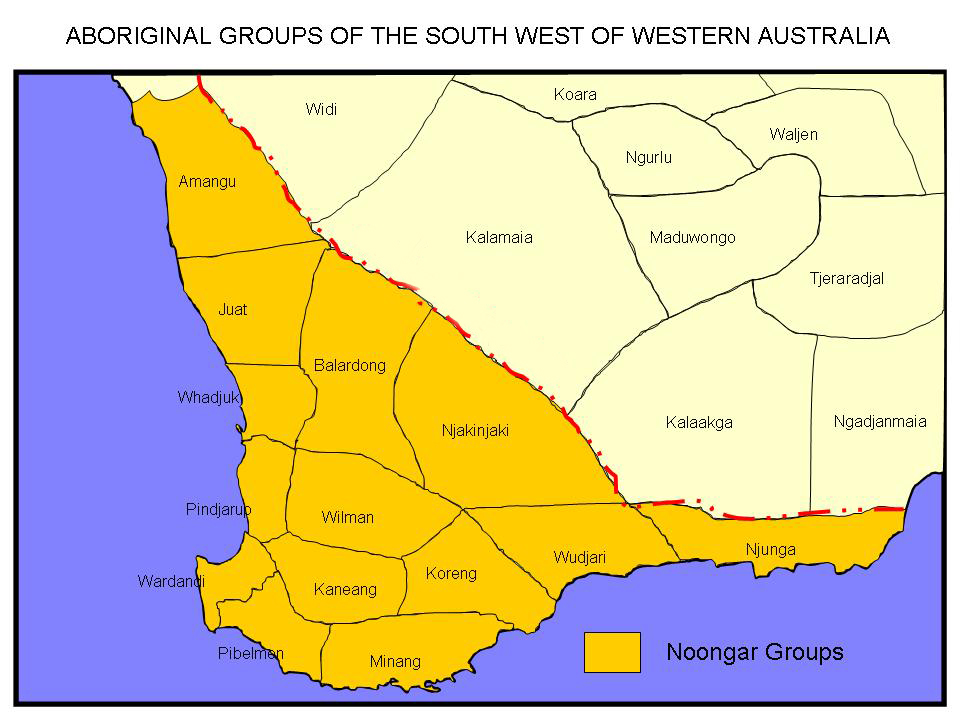
Noongar language groups

Menang, also spelt Mineng, Minang, Minanga, or Mirnong, are an Aboriginal Noongar people of southern Western Australia. They are the traditional custodians of the Country in and around the city of Albany.

== Name ==
Anthropologist Norman Tindale etymologised the ethnonym Minang as coming from the word for south, minaq. According to Tindale, the term originated as an exonym used by the Kaalamaya people, who lived further north and were therefore referring to the Minang as "southerners".

In 1831, colonist medical practitioner Isaac Scott Nind proposed that the name Meananger for the inhabitants of King George Sound and its immediate vicinity came from a combination of a local word mearn, meaning "bloodroot/kangaroo's paw", and anger, meaning "to eat". Combined, the name identifies these people as those who eat bloodroot, since the root, generally disliked by other Indigenous groups, was to be found abundantly on their land.

== Country ==
The Minang's traditional lands encompassed some 4,900 square miles (13,000 km^{2}) from King George Sound northwards to the Stirling Range. It took in Tenterden, Lake Muir, Cowerup and the Shannon River area. Along the coast their territory ran from West Cliff Point to Boat Harbour, Pallinup. Mount Barker, Nornalup, Wilson Inlet and Porongurup Range were also part of their territory.

== Pre-colonial European contact ==
The site of the city of Albany is called Kinjarling in the Menang Noongar language. The first European record of a sighting of Kinjarling was made by Dutch mariner Peter Nuyts in 1627. In 1791, Menang land was claimed as part of the British crown by George Vancouver, but the British made no effort to establish a formal settlement until the 19th century.

Norman Tindale mentions a passage in Charles Darwin's Voyage of the Beagle that may reflect an encounter with the Minang. Describing his 8-day sojourn in the King George Sound, he stated that "we did not during our voyage pass a more dull and uninteresting time", save for an nighttime performance by the people he referred to as the "White Cockatoo men" and the people "belonging to King George's Sound". The passage describes the men of each group putting on white body paint and performing traditional dances and music together around large fires, with the women and children being spectators. One of the dances was called "the Emu dance", while another was said to emulate hunting kangaroos. After the dancing, both groups collectively "formed a great circle on the ground, and the boiled rice and sugar was distributed, to the delight of all".

In 1826, a military outpost was established at King George Sound by Edmund Lockyer, which would become the first British settlement in Western Australia.

== Early colonial history ==
Aboriginal people in the Albany settlement experienced incarceration, often for minor offences or due to their actions being misinterpreted by colonial authorities. The Albany Convict Gaol constructed a cell for Aboriginal prisoners in 1874, segregating them from white prisoners. The walls of this cell still hold visible artworks made by incarcerated Indigenous people in the 1870s.

== Culture ==
One of the most famous singers of the Noongar peoples was a Mineng man, Nebinyan, who had worked many years as a hand on a whaling ship in the coastal waters of the Indian Ocean and the Great Australian Bight, and lived to achieve distinction as a singer of the narrative songs he wove around his experiences. One particular song, on a whale hunt, was heard and admired by Daisy Bates, who jotted down details, but failed to record it. Another performance by Nebinyan, transmitting a dance his grandfather had created to mimic what he had observed when Matthew Flinders had set foot on the southern coast a century earlier, was also greatly admired.

In terms of social organisation, the Minang were divided into groups. A northerly group of these, known as the Munite, may perhaps refer to the "White Cockatoo" people mentioned in other sources.

== 21st century ==
The Minang now predominantly live in and around Albany and the surrounding South Coast area of Western Australia.

The first Indigenous doll to appear on the Australian children’s television program Play School was created by a Menang woman, Kiya Watt. The doll was also named Kiya, which means "hello" in the Noongar language. Kiya the doll made her debut appearance during NAIDOC Week in 2019.

In 2020, Albany began to officially use both English and Menang Noongar place names. The local council and Menang people worked together on this dual-naming project. Menang Elders and Albany residents were consulted to identify places of significance. There were 28 places approved for dual-naming, including popular and significant sites such as Dog Rock/Yakkan Toort and Green Island/Watami.

== Alternative names ==
- Mean-anger, Meernanger
- Meenung (Koreng exonym)
- Minnal Yungar ("southern men")
- Minung, Meenung
- Mirnong
- Mount Barker tribe

Source: Tindale 1974, p. 248

== Some words ==
- janka (white man)
- mam (father)
- moking (wild dog)
- nginung, ngyank, nonk (mother)
- nop, kooling (baby)
- twert (tame dog)

Source: Spencer, Hossell & Knight 1886
