= Sandpatch, Western Australia =

Locality in the City of Albany, Western Australia

Sandpatch
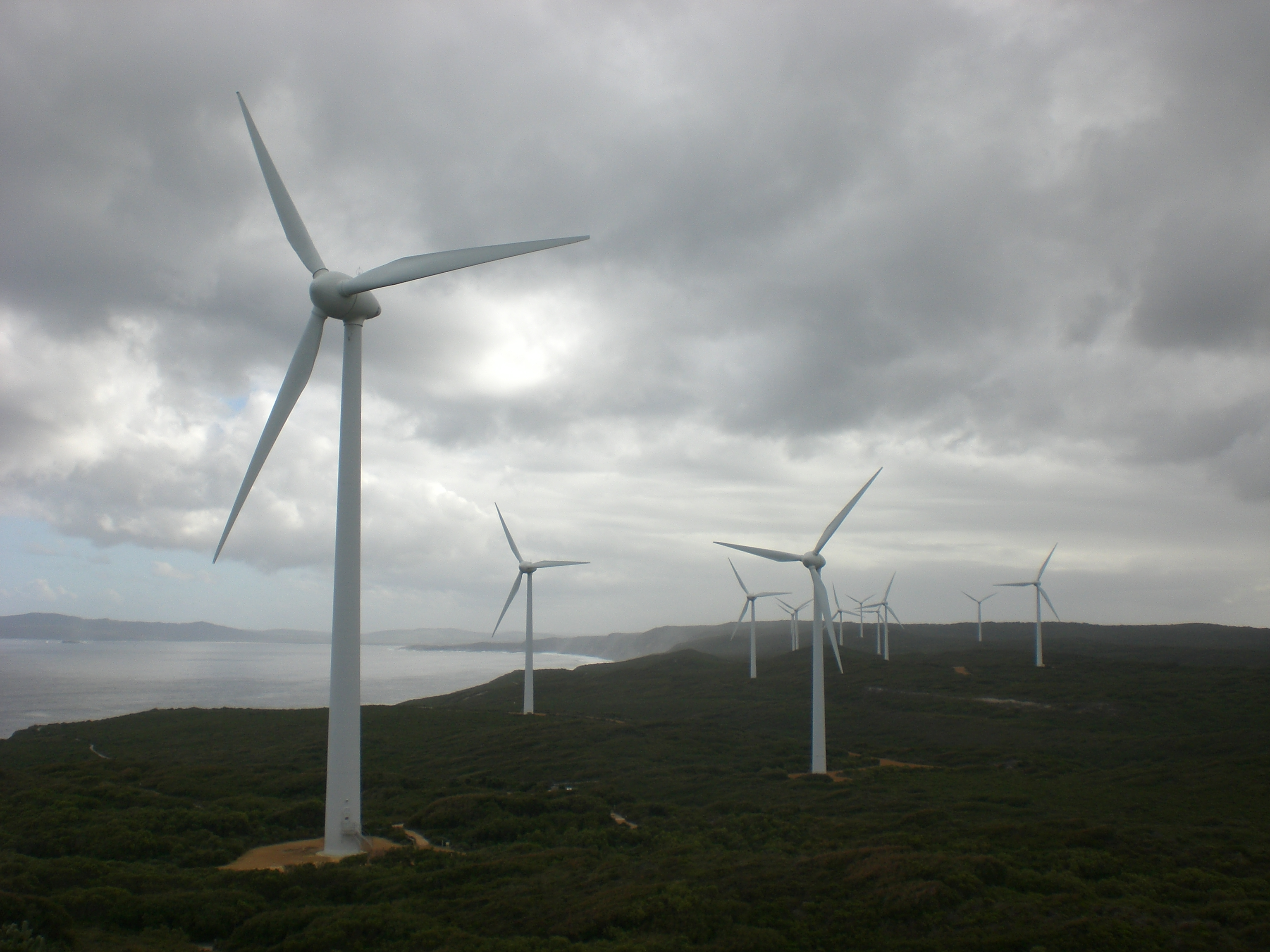
- Albany Wind Farm in Sandpatch

- Interactive map of Sandpatch
- Coordinates: 35.057351°S 117.782306°E
- Country: Australia
- State: Western Australia
- LGA: City of Albany
- Location: 388 km (241 mi) SE of Perth; 10 km (6.2 mi) SE of Denmark; 40 km (25 mi) W of Albany

Government
  - State electorate: Albany
  - Federal division: O'Connor

Area
  - Total: 23.2 km^{2} (9.0 sq mi)

Population
  - Total: 0 (SAL 2016)
- Postcode: 6330
Localities around Sandpatch
Elleker	Cuthbert	Robinson
Elleker	Sandpatch	Torndirrup
	Southern Ocean	Torndirrup

Sandpatch is a suburb of the City of Albany in the Great Southern region of Western Australia, located along the Southern Ocean. In the east, it borders the locality of Torndirrup and Torndirrup National Park. Sandpatch is the location of the Albany Wind Farm.

Sandpatch is on the traditional land of the Minang people of the Noongar nation.

In the late 1870s, the Albany Sand Patch, a set of four sand dunes, were identified as a hazard to the Princess Royal Harbour, with the possibility of it gradually filling up the harbour being feared. The sand patch started at the shore and extended 5 kilometres (3.1 mi) inland to the west, but its extend into the harbour could also be seen at low tide. Using prison labour, a barrier made from stakes and brushwood was constructed to prevent the sand from moving further into the harbour. Once the barrier was installed, seeds were sown. Despite setbacks in the form of only certain types of plants thriving in the sandy environment and other dying, like 8,000 trees planted in 1883, of which none survived, the problem was considered under control by 1886.
