= The Cow and The Calf =

Rocks on south coast of Western Australia

The Cow and the Calf
- Location within Western Australia

Geography
- Coordinates: 35°00′56.7″S 116°13′10.9″E

Administration
- Australia

The Cow and The Calf, also known as Cow and Calf Rocks, are basalt rock formations off the south coast of Western Australia. They are 26 kilometres (16 mi) south east of Windy Harbour and can be seen from there on a clear day. They are particularly notable for their high abundance of abalone and as a popular destination for both commercial fishing and sports fishing.

== See also ==
- Sandy Island (Windy Harbour)
- Quagering Island
- Chatham Island (Western Australia)
