= Torndirrup, Western Australia =

Locality in the City of Albany, Western Australia

Torndirrup
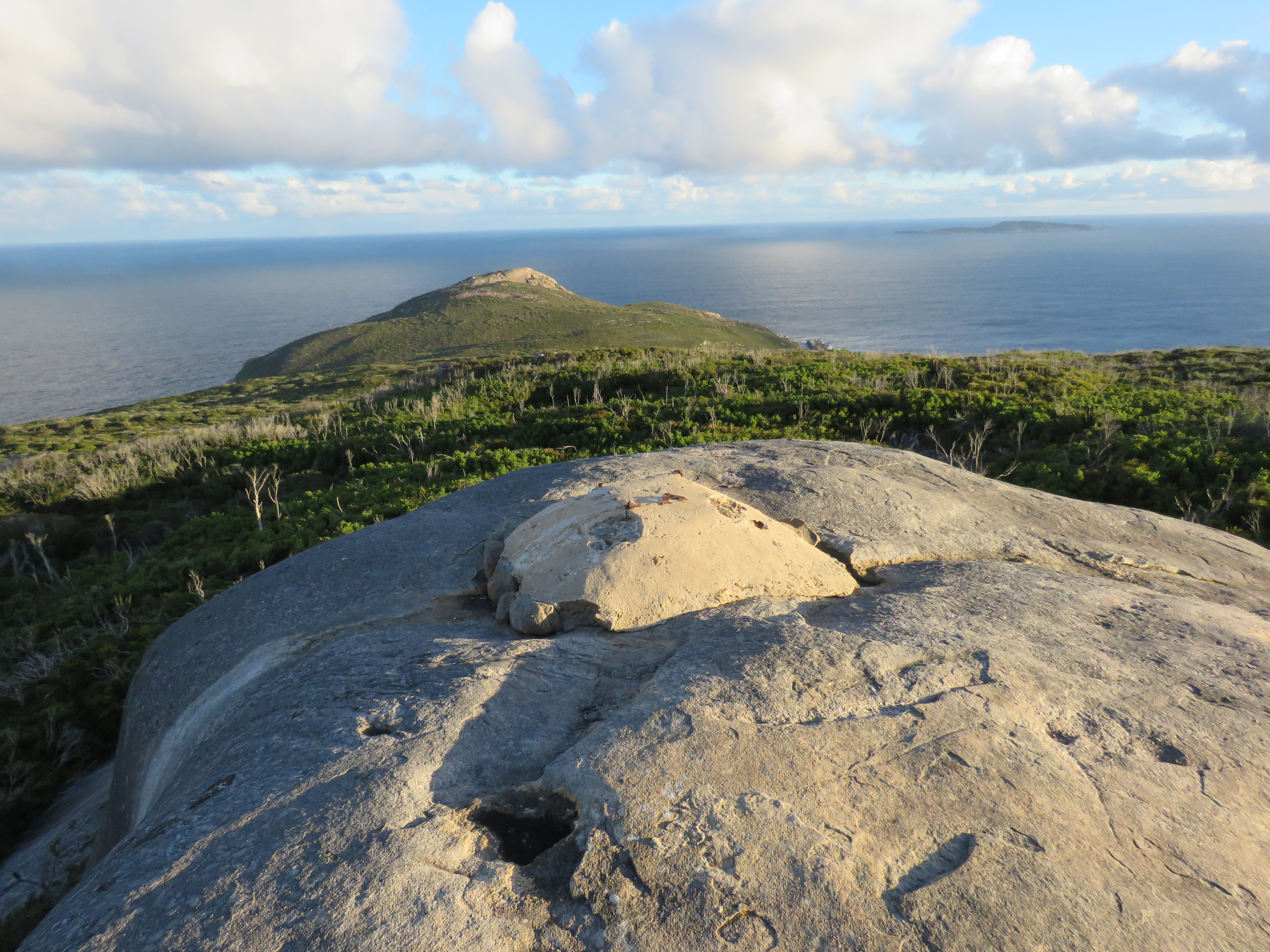
- Remnants of RAAF Air Warning Radar Station on Stony Hill, with Eclipse Island in the background

- Interactive map of Torndirrup
- Coordinates: 35.10067°S 117.88080°E
- Country: Australia
- State: Western Australia
- LGA: City of Albany
- Location: 397 km (247 mi) SE of Perth; 51 km (32 mi) E of Denmark; 8 km (5.0 mi) S of Albany

Government
  - State electorate: Albany
  - Federal division: O'Connor

Area
  - Total: 50.5 km^{2} (19.5 sq mi)

Population
  - Total: 395 (SAL 2021)
- Postcode: 6330
Localities around Torndirrup
Robinson	Big Grove	Frenchman Bay
Sandpatch	Torndirrup	Southern Ocean
	Southern Ocean

Torndirrup is a locality of the City of Albany in the Great Southern region of Western Australia. Torndirrup is on a peninsula of the same name and surrounded on three sides by water, with the Southern Ocean in the south and east and the King George Sound in the north-east. It also borders Princess Royal Harbour in the north-west. The entirety of Torndirrup National Park is located within Torndirrup and only small sections of the locality are not part of the national park.

Torndirrup is on the traditional land of the Minang people of the Noongar nation.

The state registered Cheyne Beach Whaling Station is located on Frenchman Bay, King George Sound, in the locality of Torndirrup.

During World War II, from 1943 to 1945, Stony Hill was the site of the Royal Australian Air Force Air Warning Radar Station Number 35.
