= Quaranup =

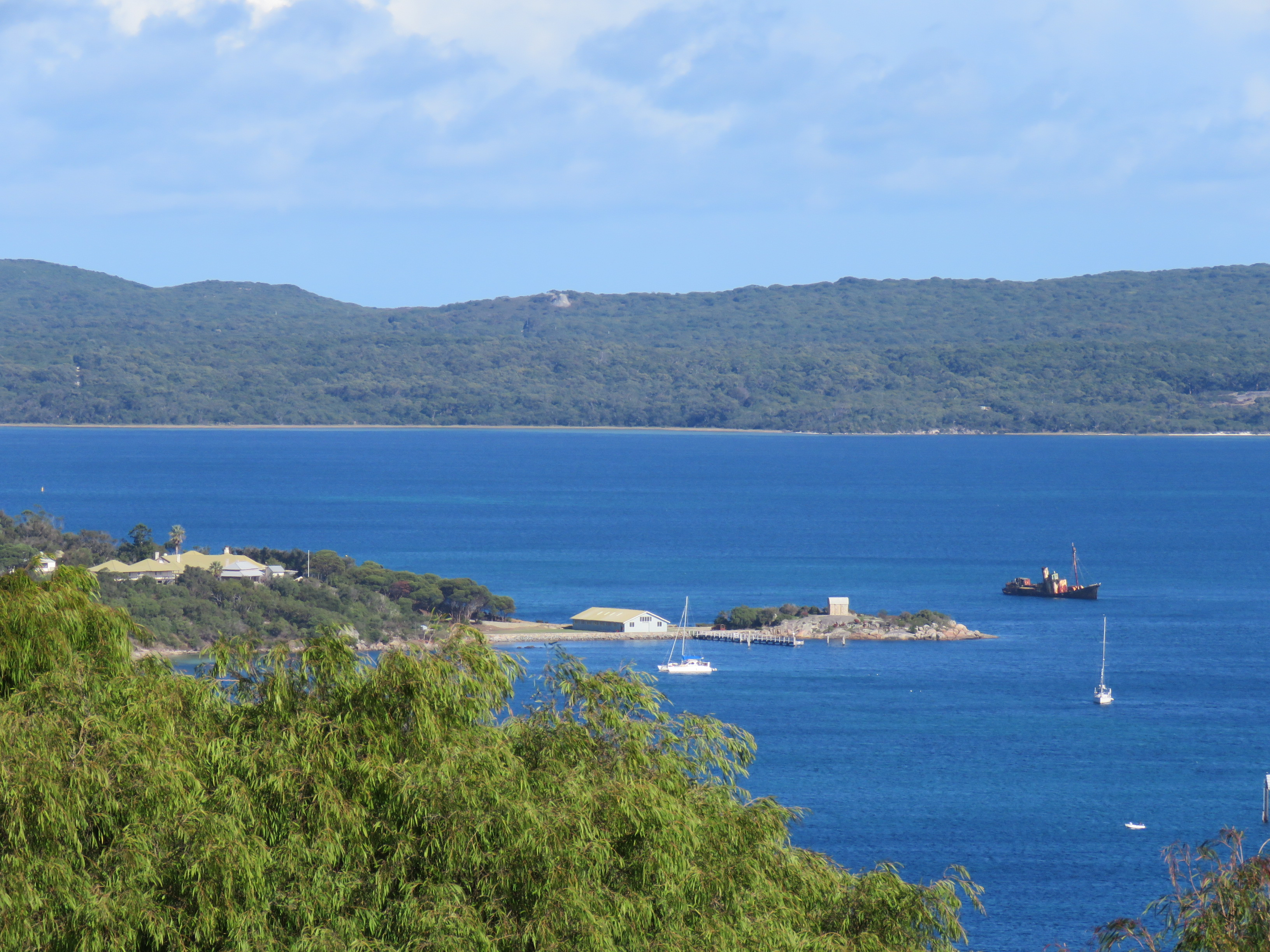
- The Quaranup Complex and the whaler Cheynes II seen from the Princess Royal Fortress
- Interactive map of the Quaranup area

General information
- Type: Historic Quarantine Station
- Location: Albany, Western Australia
- Coordinates: 35°03′08.7″S 117°54′48.6″E

Western Australia Heritage Register
- Official name: Quaranup Complex
- Type: State Registered Place
- Designated: 14 December 2001
- Reference no.: 84

Quaranup, also known as Camp Quaranup and Albany Quarantine Station, was once a quarantine station in Albany, Western Australia; it now operates as a camp for tourists and school excursions.

Situated in a Class A nature reserve on the Vancouver Peninsula on the shoreline of Princess Royal Harbour opposite the Port of Albany, the camp has panoramic views of Albany. The complex consists of 17 separate stone and timber-framed structures in varying architectural styles.

The necessity of a quarantine station arose after a number of incidents involving sickness aboard ships arriving in Albany, which lead to demands for a quarantine station to be built close to the port. These included an illness on the Bombay in 1865, suspected smallpox on the Rangatira in 1872 and a sick passenger aboard the Baroda the following year. No plans were made until a group of dignitaries including the Colonial Secretary, Frederick Barlee, were quarantined in tents during inclement weather on barren Mistaken Island for a period of two weeks. The irate officials then took an interest in having a permanent quarantine station close to the port. Tenders were called for and the facility was established in 1875. Initially the centre consisted of only a caretaker's cottage and jetty costing £530.

A powder magazine was built on Geake island, the windowless stone building with an iron door used to store ammunition was completed in 1878. Further additions to the complex were completed in 1897, including the doctor's and servant's quarters, isolation ward, mortuary, laundry, wash house, general store, and first class quarters. A fumigation bath house and a jetty were built in 1903. The station was used to deal with various epidemics and diseases until 1930 with a final outbreak of influenza, after this the facility was virtually closed.

During World War II, the facility operated as a submarine base. American servicemen were also billeted there for rest and recuperation in 1942.

The station was decommissioned in 1956. The Wheeler family then privately leased the station later the same year and the name was changed to Camp Quaranup. The Wheelers operated the camp until 1970. The site was then vested in the Shire of Albany who subsequently leased the camp to the Albany Youth Committee in 1971.

The station was classified by the National Trust in 1977. The complex was deemed significant for its architectural character and its historic foundation.

In 1992 the Department of Sport and Recreation sub-leased the camp to Rob and Joanne Lucas for a period of five years with a five-year option. A lookout was built at the highest point on the peninsula known as Quarantine Hill by the camp managers in 1997. Surrounding points of interest that can be seen from the lookout include; Cheyne Beach Whaling Station, Torndirrup National Park, Princess Royal Harbour, King George Sound, Goode Beach, Little Grove and Big Grove.

The camp was closed for late 2005 and early 2006 and reopened by Premier Alan Carpenter in April 2006 after a A$1.1 million renovation. The kitchen was refurbished, toilet blocks were upgraded, new water storage and filtration equipment were installed, and asbestos was removed from the site.

== See also ==
- List of places on the State Register of Heritage Places in the City of Albany
