= Point D'Entrecasteaux =

Point in Western Australia

Coordinates: 34°50′S 116°0′E

Point D'Entrecasteaux is a point on the south coast of Western Australia. The first European sighting was by the Frenchman Antoine Bruni d'Entrecasteaux in the 1700s, although there were possible sightings by Dutch navigators from ships such as Leeuwin in the 1600s. (Note: See, for instance, Pieter Nuyts' activities in the early 1600s.) The nearest populated site on the coast is Windy Harbour to the east of the point, and Northcliffe to the north. The point is located within the D'Entrecasteaux National Park.

The main location west on the coast is Cape Leeuwin, and to the east is Point Nuyts. There are named islands near the point, including Quagering Island and Sandy Island.

It has been a site of material found from the ocean.

There also had been reports of heavy sea conditions in the vicinity. It was frequently used as a reference point for reports on geology and biota relevant to the south coast of Western Australia. It was also a referent point for maritime navigation and cartographic charts.
