= Robinson, Western Australia =

Suburb of the City of Albany, Western Australia

Robinson
- Suburb
- Interactive map of Robinson
- Country: Australia
- State: Western Australia
- City: Albany
- LGA: City of Albany
- Location: 5.0 km (3.1 mi) from Albany

Government
  - State electorate: Albany
  - Federal division: O'Connor

Area
  - Total: 11.7 km^{2} (4.5 sq mi)

Population
  - Total: 696 (SAL 2021)
- Postcode: 6330
Suburbs around Robinson
Gledhow	Gledhow	Mount Elphinstone
Cuthbert	Robinson	Princess Royal Harbour
Sandpatch	Little Grove	Princess Royal Harbour

Robinson is a western suburb of Albany in southern Western Australia, west of Albany's central business district. Its local government area is the City of Albany. The suburb has a median age of 43.

Frenchman Bay Road passes through the suburb to Little Grove and then on to Torndirrup National Park and Frenchman Bay.

In March 2010, the area was evacuated as a result of a catastrophic bushfire. The fire started after a motorcycle accident and quickly spread through the surrounding bushland.

Fire fighters battled flames as high as 10 metres (33 ft) using two water bombers and a helicopter. The fire was eventually contained following overnight rain.
