= Acacia uliginosa =

Scientific classification
- Kingdom: Plantae
- Clade: Tracheophytes
- Clade: Angiosperms
- Clade: Eudicots
- Clade: Rosids
- Order: Fabales
- Family: Fabaceae
- Subfamily: Caesalpinioideae
- Clade: Mimosoid clade
- Genus: Acacia
- Species: A. uliginosa

Binomial name
- Acacia uliginosa Maslin
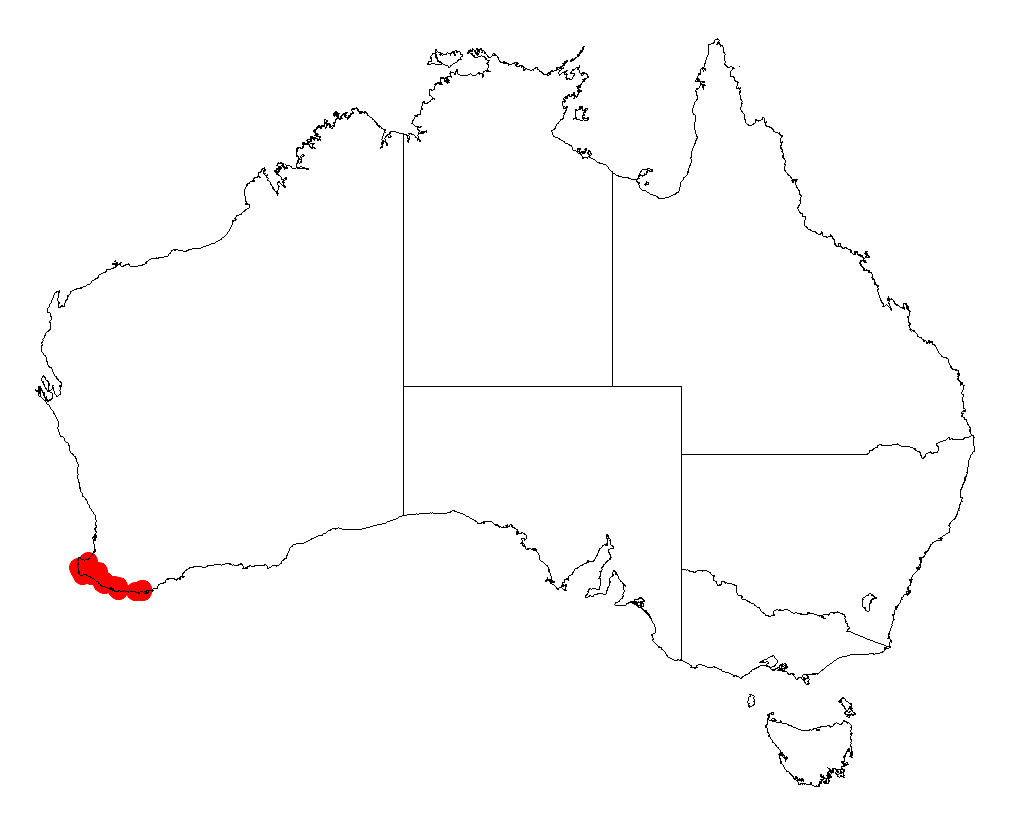
- Occurrence data from AVH

Species of legume

Habit near Millar Road, in Elleker, Western Australia

Acacia uliginosa is a shrub of the genus Acacia and the subgenus Phyllodineae. It is native to an area in the South West and Great Southern regions of Western Australia.

== Ecology ==
The diffuse slender shrub typically grows to a height of 0.3 to 1.8 metres (1 to 6 ft). It blooms in September and produces yellow flowers.

== See also ==
- List of Acacia species
