= List of shipwrecks in January 1858 =

The list of shipwrecks in January 1858 includes ships sunk, foundered, wrecked, grounded, or otherwise lost during January 1858.

== 1 January ==
List of shipwrecks: 1 January 1858
Ship	State	Description
Eyrie	United Kingdom	The ship sank at Belfast, County Antrim. The wreck was subsequently destroyed by the Belfast Harbour Commissioners.
Friendship	United Kingdom	The ship ran aground and sank at Fowey, Cornwall.
Friendship	United Kingdom	The sloop departed from Cromarty for Fraserburgh, Aberdeenshire. No further trace, presumed foundered with the loss of all hands.
Jessie	United Kingdom	The sloop was driven ashore and wrecked in Cranfield Bay. Her crew were rescued. She was on a voyage from Liverpool, Lancashire to Youghal, County Cork.
John Walker	United Kingdom	The schooner capsized in a squall at Demerara, British Guiana with the loss of all but one of her thirteen crew.
Vischnou	France	The ship was driven ashore and wrecked at Tenerife, Canary Islands with the loss of seven of her crew. She was on a voyage from the Gambia River to Marseille, Bouches-du-Rhône.
Volo	United Kingdom	The ship sprang a leak and was abandoned in the Mediterranean Sea. Her crew were rescued. She was on a voyage from Brăila, Ottoman Empire to Cork or Falmouth, Cornwall.

== 2 January ==
List of shipwrecks: 2 January 1858
Ship	State	Description
Despina	Greece	The barque ran aground in the River Lee and was severely damaged.
Ellergill	United Kingdom	The ship struck the Hartley Rock and was damaged. She put back to South Shields, County Durham.
Henry Tanner	United Kingdom	The barque was driven ashore at Alnmouth, Northumberland. She was on a voyage from the Nieuw Diep to Newcastle upon Tyne, Northumberland. Henry Tanner was refloated on 16 January and taken in to Warkworth, Northumberland.
Louis	United Kingdom	The smack was abandoned in the Bristol Channel. Her crew were rescued by the fishing vessel Ann (United Kingdom). Louis came ashore at Port Eynon Point, Glamorgan and was wrecked. She was on a voyage from Llanelli, Glamorgan to Rouen, Seine-Inférieure, France.
Nelly	United Kingdom	The ship struck the Sillycar Rocks, off the coast of Northumberland. She was on a voyage from Leith, Lothian to South Shields. She was refloated and resumed her voyage, but consequently sank 4 nautical miles (7.4 km) north east of Lindisfarne, Northumberland.
Richard and Elizabeth	United Kingdom	The schooner caught fire and was scuttled at Bursledon, Hampshire. She was on a voyage from Portsmouth, Hampshire to a Scottish port
Sophia	Prussia	The brig ran aground on the Blackwater Bank, in the Irish Sea off the coast of County Wexford, United Kingdom and sank. Her crew were rescued. She was on a voyage from Troon, Ayrshire, United Kingdom to Smyrna, Ottoman Empire.

== 3 January ==
List of shipwrecks: 3 January 1858
Ship	State	Description
Heatherbell	United Kingdom	The ship was abandoned in the Indian Ocean. Her crew were rescued by Queen Margaret (Flag unknown). Heatherbell was on a voyage from Bird Island, Algoa Bay, Cape Colony to London.
Louis	France	The sloop spang a leak and was abandoned in the Bristol Channel. Her crew were rescued by the fishing smack Ann Lewis (United Kingdom). Louis was on a voyager from Llanelly, Glamorgan, United Kingdom to Rouen, Seine-Inférieure. She came ashore at Oxwich Point, Glamorgan and was wrecked.
Maid of the Mill	United Kingdom	The ship ran aground at Inverness. She was on a voyage from Riga, Russia to Belfast, County Antrim.
Siluria	United Kingdom	The ship was driven ashore at Calais, France. She was on a voyage from Antwerp, Belgium to Portsmouth, Hampshire. She was refloated and completed her voyage.

== 4 January ==
List of shipwrecks: 4 January 1858
Ship	State	Description
France et Brazil	France	The ship was wrecked on the Kish Bank, in Dublin Bay with the loss of one of her eighteen crew. She was on a voyage from Liverpool, Lancashire to Rio de Janeiro, Brazil.
Pandora	United Kingdom	The ship struck a submerged object and was wrecked West Hartlepool, County Durham.

== 5 January ==
List of shipwrecks: 5 January 1858
Ship	State	Description
Albertus	Hamburg	The ship ran aground on the Longsand, in the North Sea off the coast of Essex, United Kingdom. She was on a voyage from Hamburg to Trieste. She was refloated with the assistance of the smack Snowdrop (United Kingdom) and assisted into Harwich, Essex.
Blucher	Bremen	The ship was beached at Sunderland, County Durham, United Kingdom and was wrecked. Her crew were rescued. She was on a voyage from Bremen to Sunderland.
General Williams	United Kingdom	The ship was driven ashore and wrecked at "Cutter Harbour", British North America. She was on a voyage from Saint Stephen, New Brunswick, British North America to Liverpool, Lancashire.
Margaret	United Kingdom	The barque ran aground on Scroby Sands, Norfolk. She was refloated but consequently sank. Her crew were rescued. She was on a voyage from Hartlepool, County Durham to Barcelona, Spain.
Martha	United Kingdom	The schooner was abandoned at sea. Her crew were rescued by the brig Delphine (United Kingdom). Martha was on a voyage from Cardiff, Glamorgan to Alicante, Spain.
Minerva	United Kingdom	The ship ran aground at Hartlepool and was severely damaged. She was on a voyage from South Shields, County Durham to London. She was later refloated and taken in to Blyth, Northumberland for repairs.
Philadelphia	United States	The steamship ran aground in the Mississippi River. She was on a voyage from New Orleans, Louisiana to New York.
Success	United Kingdom	The schooner was abandoned off Segna, Austrian Empire. She was reboarded on 7 January.

== 6 January ==
List of shipwrecks: 6 January 1858
Ship	State	Description
Assomption	France	The brig was driven ashore at Twielenfleth, Kingdom of Hanover. She was refloated and taken in to Brünshausen.
Balaklava	United Kingdom	The barque was driven ashore at Brünshausen. She was refloated and taken in to the Elbe.
Bon St. Nicholas	France	The brig was driven ashore at Twielenfleth. She was refloated on 12 January and assisted in to Cuxhaven.
Infallibloe	1786 Austrian Empire	The brig was wrecked at "Trefontain", Sicily. She was on a voyage from the Dardanelles to an English port.
Jemima	United Kingdom	The barque was driven ashore in Portuguese Bay, Ceylon. She was refloated on 24 June.
Onderneming	Netherlands	The koff ran aground off Gedser Odde, Denmark with the loss of one life. She was on a voyage from Stolpemünde, Prussia to Newcastle upon Tyne, Northumberland, United Kingdom.
Panama	(United Kingdom of Great Britain and Ireland) New South Wales	The brig foundered off Chatham Island with the loss of eight of her crew. She was on a voyage from Kangaroo Island to Sydney.

== 7 January ==
List of shipwrecks: 7 January 1858
Ship	State	Description
Albert	United Kingdom	The ship ran aground and sank in Cardigan Bay. Her crew were rescued by Progress (United Kingdom). Albert was on a voyage from Liverpool, Lancashire to Montevideo, Uruguay.
Best	United Kingdom	The ship sank off the coast of Pembrokeshire. Her crew survived. She was on a voyage from Milford Haven, Pembrokeshire to Aberystwyth, Cardiganshire.
Ernani	Flag unknown	The ship ran aground at Waterford, United Kingdom. She was on a voyage from Odesa to Waterford.
Isabella	United Kingdom	The ship was driven ashore by ice at "Vollerwyk", Duchy of Holstein. She was on a voyage from Rendsburg, Duchy of Holstein to Grangemouth, Stirlingshire.
Margaret	United Kingdom	The sloop ran aground at Lindisfarne, Northumberland and was abandoned by her crew. She was on a voyage from Sunderland, County Durham to Montrose, Forfarshire. She was refloated the next day and taken in to Lindisfarne in a severely damaged condition.
Snowdon	United Kingdom	The barque ran aground on the Colonel's Rock, off the coast of County Cork. She was on a voyage from Rio de Janeiro, Brazil to Queenstown, County Cork. She was refloated the next day.

== 8 January ==
List of shipwrecks: 8 January 1858
Ship	State	Description
Annie Gibson	United Kingdom	The schooner ran aground at False Immanuel Head, Berwickshire. She was on a voyage from Glasgow, Renfrewshire to Hull, Yorkshire. She was refloated the next day and taken in to Berwick upon Tweed, Northumberland in a leaky condition.
Catapilco	United Kingdom	The steamship ran aground at "Pichadangui", Chile. She was on a voyage from Valparaíso to Zapallar. She was refloated.
Marie	Denmark	The ship was driven ashore at "Oggle". Her crew were rescued. She was on a voyage from London, United Kingdom to Fredrikshavn.

== 9 January ==
List of shipwrecks: 9 January 1858
Ship	State	Description
Ernain	United Kingdom	The ship ran aground at Liverpool, Lancashire. She was refloated.
Mary	United Kingdom	The schooner was severely damaged by fire at Cowes, Isle of Wight. She was on a voyage from Brading, Isle of Wight to Havre de Grâce, Seine-Inférieure, France.
Macao	Netherlands	The ship ran aground on Miguder's Shoal. She was refloated and put back to Batavia, Netherlands East Indies.
Mary C. Dyner	United States	The ship was driven ashore at Barnegat, New Jersey. She was refloated on 2 February and towed in to New York.
New England	United States	The ship caught fire in the Atlantic Ocean and was abandoned. Her eighteen crew were rescued by the barque Cora Linn (United Kingdom) but one of them subsequently died from his burns. New England was on a voyage from New York to the Clyde.

== 10 January ==
List of shipwrecks: 10 January 1858
Ship	State	Description
Louis Armand	France	The barque was abandoned in the Atlantic Ocean. Her crew were rescued by the steamship Teutonia (Hamburg). Louis Armand was on a voyage from Réunion to Nantes, Loire-Inférieure.
Miranda	Rostock	The brigantine struck a rock on the west coast of the Isle of Harris, Outer Hebrides, United Kingdom and sank with the loss of her captain. She was on a voyage from Liverpool, Lancashire, United Kingdom to Saint Domingo.
Strive	United Kingdom	The schooner ran aground on the Sillycar Rocks, off the coast of Northumberland. She was on a voyage from Port Dundas, Renfrewshire to South Shields, County Durham. She was refloated on 13 January and assisted in to Berwick upon Tweed, Northumberland in a severely damaged condition.

== 11 January ==
List of shipwrecks: 11 January 1858
Ship	State	Description
Agnes	United Kingdom	The ship was wrecked on Sal, Cape Verde Islands. Her crew were rescued. She was on a voyage from Rio de Janeiro, Brazil to the Cape Verde Islands.
Jane Emily	United Kingdom	The brig was driven ashore 2 nautical miles (3.7 km) south of Aveiro, Portugal. Her crew were rescued. She was on a voyage from Saint John's, Newfoundland, British North America to Porto, Portugal.
Regina	United Kingdom	The brig ran aground on the Barber Sand, in the North Sea off the coast of Norfolk. She was on a voyage from Sunderland, County Durham to London. She was refloated and taken in to Great Yarmouth, Norfolk in a leaky condition.
Valetta	United Kingdom	The ship was driven ashore at Charleston, South Carolina, United States. She was on a voyage from Liverpool, Lancashire to Charleston.
Washington	United Kingdom	The ship caught fire and was wrecked at Hanover Island, Chile. Her 23 crew were rescued. She was on a voyage from Cardiff, Glamorgan to Caldera, Chile.

== 12 January ==
List of shipwrecks: 12 January 1858
Ship	State	Description
Ardent	United Kingdom	The brig was driven ashore in Queendall Bay, Shetland Islands. She was on a voyage from Limerick to Liverpool, Lancashire. She had become a wreck by 18 January.
Catherina	United Kingdom	The brig was in collision with brig Westmoreland (United Kingdom) and sank in the North Sea 12 nautical miles (22 km) south-east of Flamborough Head, Yorkshire. Her crew were rescued by Westmoreland. Catherina was on a voyage from Sunderland, County Durham to London with coal.
Duke of Argyll	United Kingdom	The paddle steamer ran aground in Tolen Bay. She was on a voyage from Glasgow, Renfrewshire to Stornoway, Isle of Lewis, Outer Hebrides.
Eclipse	United Kingdom	The barque was driven ashore and wrecked in Sandwick Bay, Shetland Islands. She was on a voyage from Newport, Monmouthshire to Madras, India.
Familiens Haab	Denmark	The ship was lost on the Jedderen Reef, in the North Sea. She was on a voyage from "Bidstrup" to Leith, Lothian, United Kingdom.
Nouvelle Active	France	African Slave Trade: The schooner was wrecked on a reef in the Sainte Channel with the loss of 82 lives She was on a voyage from Basse-Terre Island to Grande-Terre, Guadeloupe.

== 13 January ==
List of shipwrecks: 13 January 1858
Ship	State	Description
Arpadina	United Kingdom	The ship was driven ashore and wrecked in Antioch Bay. She was on a voyage from Brăila, Ottoman Empire to Cork or Falmouth, Cornwall.
Dewdrop	United Kingdom	The brig ran aground on the Goodwin Sands, Kent. She was on a voyage from Sunderland, County Durham to Alexandria, Egypt. She was refloated and resumed her voyage.
Genova	United Kingdom	The steamship was wrecked near São Miguel Island, Azores.
Grantham	United Kingdom	The ship ran aground on the Newcombe Sand, in the North Sea off the coast of Suffolk. She was on a voyage from South Shields, County Durham to London.
Reveil	France	The schooner was driven ashore at Brielle, South Holland, Netherlands. Her crew were rescued. She was on a voyage from Newcastle upon Tyne, Northumberland, United Kingdom to a port on Sicily.

== 14 January ==
List of shipwrecks: 14 January 1858
Ship	State	Description
Countess of Leven and Melville	United Kingdom	The ship struck the Plough Rock and was damaged. She was on a voyage from Perth to London. She was assisted in to North Sunderland, County Durham.
Henrietta Brewis	United Kingdom	The barque ran aground on Scharhörn. She was on a voyage from Madras, India to Bremen. She was refloated and taken in to Cuxhaven in a leaky condition.
James	United Kingdom	The schooner collided with Majestas and sank in the Irish Sea off Point Lynas, Anglesey. Her crew were rescued. She was on a voyage from Ayr to Runcorn, Cheshire.
John and Eliza	United Kingdom	The ship was driven ashore and wrecked at Saint Lucia. She was on a voyage from Bonny, Africa to Liverpool, Lancashire.

== 15 January ==
List of shipwrecks: 15 January 1858
Ship	State	Description
C. S. Pennell	United States	The ship was damaged in a storm at New Orleans, Louisiana.
Ellen Stewart	United States	The ship was severely damaged in a storm at New Orleans.
Innes	United Kingdom	The schooner was driven ashore at Boulmer, Northumberland. She was refloated and taken in to Warkworth, Northumberland in a leaky condition.
Maria	United Kingdom	The brig ran aground on the Goodwin Sands, Kent. She was on a voyage from London to Saint Kitts. She was refloated.
Valetta	United Kingdom	The ship ran aground in the Maffett Channel. She was on a voyage from Liverpool, Lancashire to Charleston, South Carolina, United States. She was refloated with the assistance of two steamships and towed in to Charleston.

== 16 January ==
List of shipwrecks: 16 January 1858
Ship	State	Description
Alfred	United Kingdom	The ship was run down and sunk in the English Channel by a French brig.
Ann Martin	United Kingdom	The barque was lost near Rio de Janeiro, Brazil.
Friends	United Kingdom	The schooner was run down and sunk off the Isle of Wight by a French brig. Her crew took to a boat; they were rescued by a fishing smack. She was on a voyage from Newcastle upon Tyne, Northumberland to Mataró, Spain.
Hermonia	Bremen	The ship foundered in the Mediterranean Sea 40 nautical miles (74 km) off Sicily. Her crew survived. She was on a voyage from Venice, Kingdom of Lombardy–Venetia to an English port.
Jupiter	United Kingdom	The ship was driven ashore and wrecked on Faial Island, Azores. Her crew were rescued.
King Alfred	United Kingdom	The ship was driven ashore and wrecked on Faial Island. Her crew were rescued.
Lady Ann	United Kingdom	The ship was driven ashore and wrecked on Faial Island. Her crew were rescued.
Maria	United Kingdom	The ship ran aground on the Goodwin Sands, Kent. She was on a voyage from London to Saint Kitts. She was refloated and resumed her voyage.
William Morgan Davies	United Kingdom	The ship was driven ashore and wrecked on Faial Island with the loss of a crew member.

== 17 January ==
List of shipwrecks: 17 January 1858
Ship	State	Description
Allah Kersim	Flag unknown	The brig was wrecked on Faial Island, Azores.
Clydeside	United Kingdom	The barque ran aground on the Sunk Sand, in the North Sea off the coast of Essex. She was on a voyage from Hartlepool, County Durham to London. Clydeside was refloated with the assistance of several smacks and taken in to Wivenhoe, Essex.
Eyre	United Kingdom	The brigantine was in collision with the steamship Semaphore (United Kingdom) and sank in the Belfast Lough. Her crew were rescued by Semaphore. Eyre was on a voyage from Ayr to Belfast, County Antrim.
Lawsons	United Kingdom	The brig ran aground at Soldier's Point, County Louth.
Washington	United Kingdom	The ship was wrecked on the coast of Patagonia, Argentina. Her 23 crew survived. They built a sloop from the wreck, and sailed on 24 February, subsequently reaching Valparaíso, Chile. Washington was on a voyage from Cardiff, Glamorgan to Caldera, Chile.

== 18 January ==
List of shipwrecks: 18 January 1858
Ship	State	Description
Earl of Surrey	United Kingdom	The ship ran aground on Taylor's Bank, in Liverpool Bay, and sank. Four crew were rescued by the Magazines Lifeboat.
Indefatigable	Austrian Empire	The ship was wrecked near the entrance to the Bosphorus.
Mal-Bagden	Austrian Empire	The ship was wrecked near the entrance to the Bosphorus.
Matilda	United Kingdom	The ship ran aground at Ceará, Brazil. She was on a voyage from Ceará to Liverpool, Lancashire. She was refloated and resumed her voyage in a leaky condition.
Oak	United Kingdom	The ship struck a sunken wreck off Sunderland, County Durham. She was beached in a waterlogged condition. She was on a voyage from Aberdeen to Seaham or Hartlepool, County Durham. Oak was taken in to Sunderland the next day in a severely damaged condition.
Themis	United Kingdom	The ship was wrecked near "Carabournou", Ottoman Empire with the loss of two of her crew.

== 19 January ==
List of shipwrecks: 19 January 1858
Ship	State	Description
Desengano	Portugal	The ship was wrecked on Terceira Island, Azores.
Margaret	United Kingdom	The ship ran aground on the Gunfleet Sand, in the North Sea off the coast of Suffolk. She was on a voyage from Aberdeen to London. She was refloated and resumed her voyage.
Palmyra	Portugal	The schooner was wrecked on Terceira Island.

== 20 January ==
List of shipwrecks: 20 January 1858
Ship	State	Description
Amelia	(United Kingdom of Great Britain and Ireland) British North America	The barque departed from Savannah, Georgia, United States for a British port. No further trace, presumed foundered with the loss of all hands.
Caroline and Sire	Norway	The schooner ran aground in the Agger Canal, Denmark. She was on a voyage from Randers to London, United Kingdom.
Hermina de Breoe	Flag unknown	The brig foundered off the coast of Sicily.
Kalodyne	Netherlands	The barque ran aground at Vlissingen, Zeeland. She was on a voyage from Antwerp, Belgium to Hartlepool, County Durham, United Kingdom. She was refloated on 6 March.
Kathinka	Russia	The barque was driven ashore at Dunkirk, Nord, France. She was on a voyage from South Shields, County Durham, United Kingdom to Riga.
Mary Anne	United Kingdom	The ship ran aground on the Dutchman's Bank, in the Irish Sea off the coast of Lancashire. Her crew were rescued.
Mary Johannah	United Kingdom	The schooner ran aground on the Dutchman's Bank and sank with the loss of a crew member.
Medina	United Kingdom	The sloop ran aground on the Warp, in the Thames Estuary. She was refloated but consequently sank. All seven people on board were rescued by the smack Eliza and Jane (United Kingdom). Medina was on a voyage from Guernsey, Channel Islands to London.
Stag	United Kingdom	The smack ran aground and sank on the Newcombe Sand, in the North Sea off the coast of Suffolk. Her crew were rescued by a tug.
Swift	United Kingdom	The steamboat was holed by an anchor and sank at Woolwich, Kent. She was on a voyage from London to Woolwich.
Thomas Hodgson	United Kingdom	The ship was damaged by fire at Riga, Russia.
Victor Emeline	France	The brig sprang a leak and was beached at Lisbon, Portugal. She was on a voyage from Newport, Monmouthshire, United Kingdom to Genoa, Kingdom of Sardinia.

== 21 January ==
List of shipwrecks: 21 January 1858
Ship	State	Description
Buenos Ayres	United Kingdom	The ship sprang a leak in the Irish Sea. She put in to Milford Haven, Pembrokeshire in a sinking condition. She was on a voyage from Liverpool, Lancashire to Buenos Aires, Argentina.
Jeune Blonde	France	The barque was wrecked on the La Folle Reefs, east of the Île-à-Vache, Haiti. She was on a voyage from Jacmel, Haiti to Belle Île, Morbihan.
Marsden	United Kingdom	The brig was driven ashore at Tetney, Lincolnshire. She was on a voyage from London to South Shields, County Durham.
Mary and Jane	United Kingdom	The brig was abandoned in the Ionian Sea and foundered. Her crew were rescued. She was on a voyage from Sunderland, County Durham to Constantinople, Ottoman Empire.
Merchant	United Kingdom	The ship foundered in the North Sea off the coast of Yorkshire with the loss of all fifteen people on board. She was on a voyage from the River Tyne to London.
Sarah Palmer	United Kingdom	The ship ran aground on the East Hoyle, in Liverpool Bay.
Sieka	Netherlands	The brig was driven ashore near Calais, France. Her crew were rescued. She was on a voyage from Königsburg, Prussia to Plymouth, Devon, United Kingdom. She had been refloated by 2 February and taken in to Calais for repairs.
Syrian	United Kingdom	The ship was abandoned in the Indian Ocean in a waterlogged condition. Her crew were rescued by Empress (United Kingdom). Syrian was on a voyage from Moulmein, Burma to Maryport, Cumberland.
Terror	Bremen	The steamship ran aground off the Weser Lighthouse. She was on a voyage from Bremen to Sunderland. She was refloated.
Windsbride	United Kingdom	The schooner was wrecked on the East Barrow Sand, in the North Sea off the coast of Essex. Her crew were rescued by the smack Magnet (United Kingdom). Windsbride was on a voyage from Seaton Sluice, County Durham to London.

== 22 January ==
List of shipwrecks: 22 January 1858
Ship	State	Description
Auguste	France	The full-rigged ship was wrecked in St Francis Bay with the loss of eight of her crew. She was on a voyage from Réunion to Marseille, Bouches-du-Rhône.
Barnabas Webb	United States	The ship ran aground at the mouth of the Mississippi River. She was on a voyage from New Orleans, Louisiana to Liverpool, Lancashire, United Kingdom.
Excel	United Kingdom	Excel The ship Excel of Weymouth, sank at Calais, France, 21–22 January.
Dawson	United Kingdom	The ship ran aground at Grimsby, Lincolnshire. She was on a voyage from Newcastle upon Tyne, Northumberland to London.
Ellerslie	United Kingdom	The barque was driven ashore and wrecked near Wexford. She was on a voyage from Liverpool to Barbados. She was refloated on 1 February and taken in to Wexford.
Excel	United Kingdom	The schooner was driven ashore and wrecked at Calais, France with the loss of all but one of her crew. The ship's dog survived. She was on a voyage from Guernsey, Channel Islands to London.
Fawn	France	The schooner was driven ashore at Cayeux-sur-Mer, Somme, France with the loss of a crew member. She was on a voyage from Sunderland, County Durham to Portsmouth, Hampshire. She was condemned.
Margaret	United Kingdom	The sloop was driven ashore at "Barnmouth", Fife.
Normandy	Flag unknown	The ship ran aground at the mouth of the Mississippi River.
Santa Maria	Grand Duchy of Tuscany	The ship departed from Newport, Monmouthshire, United Kingdom for Livorno. No further trace, presumed foundered with the loss of all hands.
Seaman's Bride	United States	The ship ran aground at the mouth of the Mississippi River.
W. H. Prescott	United States	The ship ran aground at the mouth of the Mississippi River. She was on a voyage from New Orleans to Liverpool.

== 23 January ==
List of shipwrecks: 23 January 1858
Ship	State	Description
Crimea	United Kingdom	The schooner ran aground on the Salthouse Bank, in the Irish Sea off the coast of Lancashire and sank. Her crew were rescued. She was on a voyage from Whitehaven, Cumberland to Liverpool, Lancashire.
Heckla	United Kingdom	The ship ran aground in the Sound of Bara. She was on a voyage from the Clyde to Valparaíso, Chile. She was refloated and put in to Stornoway, Isle of Lewis, Outer Hebrides in a severely damaged condition.
Hibernia	United Kingdom	The ship was wrecked on the west coast North Uist, Outer Hebrides.
Louise Estelle	France	The full-rigged ship was driven ashore near Clifton, India. She was on a voyage from Muscat, Sultanate of Muscat and Oman to Kurrachee, India. She was refloated and taken in to Kurrachee
Minerva	United Kingdom	The brig ran aground on the Hinder Bank, in the North Sea off the coast of Zeeland, Netherlands and was abandoned by her crew. She was on a voyage from Port Madoc, Caernarfonshire to Emden, Kingdom of Hanover.

== 24 January ==
List of shipwrecks: 24 January 1858
Ship	State	Description
Acor	United Kingdom	The steamship was in collision with the steamship Warrior (United Kingdom) and was severely damaged. She put in to Folkestone, Kent, where she sank. She was on a voyage from London to Corfu, United States of the Ionian Islands.
Samuel Laing	United Kingdom	The steamship ran aground on the Goodwin Sands, Kent.
William Carey	United Kingdom	The ship ran aground on the Haisborough Sands, in the North Sea off the coast of Norfolk. She was on a voyage from Leith, Lothian to Melbourne, Victoria. She was refloated the next day.

== 25 January ==
List of shipwrecks: 25 January 1858
Ship	State	Description
Capricieux	France	The ship ran aground and was wrecked at Tramore, County Waterford, United Kingdom with the loss of a crew member and two would-be rescuers. She was on a voyage from Llanelly, Glamorgan, United Kingdom to Saint-Malo, Ille-et-Vilaine.
Herefordshire	United Kingdom	The schooner was wrecked at Cemlyn, Anglesey. She was on a voyage from Liverpool, Lancashire to Bristol, Gloucestershire.
Jemima	United Kingdom	The ship was driven ashore at Fanad, County Donegal. She was on a voyage from Liverpool to "Ramilton".
Margaret Pryde	United Kingdom	The ship ran aground on the Cork Sand, in the North Sea off the coast of Essex. She was on a voyage from Hartlepool, County Durham to Rouen, Seine-Inférieure, France. She was refloated on 4 February and taken in to Margate, Kent in a leaky condition.
Ocean	United Kingdom	The ship ran aground on the Tron Rocks. She was refloated.
Premier	United Kingdom	The ship was driven ashore at Plymouth, Devon. She was on a voyage from Plymouth to Newport, Monmouthshire.
Skiddaw	United Kingdom	The ship ran aground on the Payana Shoals. She was on a voyage from She was on a voyage from Guayaquil, Ecuador to London. She was refloated and put back to Guayaquil.
Telegraph	United Kingdom	The brig was captured in the Gulf of Aden and was beached at "Ourbah", where she was stripped and plundered. HEIC ship Elphinstone ( India) rescued her crew and set the wreck on fire. Telegraph was on a voyage from Aden to the "Koora Mooria Islands" (Khuriya Muriya Islands).
William Williams	United Kingdom	The ship was driven ashore near Cape Felix. Her crew were rescued. She was on a voyage from Aden to the "Kooria Moorias" (Khuriya Muriya Islands). The local inhabitants plundered the vessel.

== 26 January ==
List of shipwrecks: 26 January 1858
Ship	State	Description
Luigia	Austrian Empire	The brig ran aground at Glandore Harbour, County Cork, United Kingdom. She was on a voyage from Hartlepool, County Durham, United Kingdom to Marseille, Bouches-du-Rhône, France.
Sarah	United Kingdom	The felucca was run down and sunk by a brig off Tarifa, Spain. Her crew survived.
Thomas	United Kingdom	The schooner was driven ashore and wrecked at Balgowan Point, Wigtownshire. Her crew were rescued.

== 27 January ==
List of shipwrecks: 27 January 1858
Ship	State	Description
Loire	France	The steamship ran aground on the East Hoyle Bank, in Liverpool Bay and broke in two. Her passengers were rescued by The Hoylake Lifeboat. She was on a voyage from Liverpool, Lancashire to London, United Kingdom.
Moselle	United Kingdom	The brig foundered 35 nautical miles (65 km) west of Cartagena, Republic of New Granada. All on board took to a boat; they were rescued on 29 January.
Navus	United Kingdom	The brig ran aground on the Ridge Sand, in the North Sea off the coast of Norfolk and sank. Her crew were rescued. She was on a voyage from South Shields, County Durham to Rochester, Kent.
Tantivy	United Kingdom	The ship foundered in the South Atlantic (30°00′S 19°40′W). Her crew were rescued by New Great Britain (United Kingdom).

== 28 January ==
List of shipwrecks: 28 January 1858
Ship	State	Description
Chancellor	United Kingdom	The ship was driven ashore at San Stefano, Ottoman Empire. She had been refloated by 5 February and taken in to port.

== 29 January ==
List of shipwrecks: 29 January 1858
Ship	State	Description
Jeune Henrietta	France	The ship was wrecked near "Roads". She was on a voyage from Africa to Marseille, Bouches-du-Rhône.
John Gilpin	United States	The clipper collided with an iceberg in the South Atlantic 150 nautical miles (280 km) off the Falkland Islands. She was abandoned the next day. Her crew were rescued by Hertfordshire (United Kingdom).
Mary Wilson	United Kingdom	The barque ran aground at Havana, Cuba and was abandoned with the loss of her captain.
Union	Spain	The brig was wrecked on Green Island, off Algeciras with the loss of six of her crew. She was on a voyage from Torrevieja to a port in Galicia.

== 30 January ==
List of shipwrecks: 30 January 1858
Ship	State	Description
Abeona	United Kingdom	The brig caught fire in the North Sea 7 nautical miles (13 km) north of Peterhead, Aberdeenshire. Her twelve crew abandoned ship. She was on a voyage from Dublin to South Shields, County Durham. She came ashore at Cairnbulg, Aberdeenshire and capsized, extinguishing the fire. She broke up on 1 February.
Bevis Tree	United Kingdom	The ship ran aground on the Newcombe Sand, in the North Sea off the coast of Suffolk. She was on a voyage from London to York. She was refloated and taken in to Great Yarmouth, Norfolk.
Eliza	United Kingdom	The schooner ran aground and capsized at Swansea, Glamorgan.
John and William	United Kingdom	The Mersey Flat was driven ashore and severely damaged at Ramsey, Isle of Man. She was on a voyage from Liverpool, Lancashire to Douglas, Isle of Man.
Scott	United Kingdom	The ship was driven ashore at South Shields, County Durham. She was refloated on 1 February.
Sir Henry Pottinger	United Kingdom	The ship ran aground at North Shields, County Durham. She was on a voyage from Cartagena, Spain to North Shields.

== 31 January ==
List of shipwrecks: 31 January 1858
Ship	State	Description
Ann Coppin	United Kingdom	The ship was driven ashore at Ayr. She was on a voyage from Londonderry to Ardrossan, Ayrshire. She was refloated on 2 February and taken in to Ayr.
Cæsar	Spain	The brig was wrecked near Algeciras with the loss of six of her eleven crew.
Emerald	(United Kingdom of Great Britain and Ireland) Jersey	The schooner was wrecked on the Foreness Rock, Margate, Kent. She was on a voyage from Grimsby, Lincolnshire to Jersey.
Hero	United Kingdom	The schooner was driven ashore and wrecked at Aberdeen. Her five crew were rescued by rocket apparatus. She was on a voyage from Peterhead, Aberdeenshire to Leith, Lothian.
Heron	United Kingdom	The brig was wrecked near Cap Gris-Nez, Pas-de-Calais, France with the loss of three of her crew. She was on a voyage from Bordeaux, Gironde, France to Sunderland, County Durham.
Mary Ann	United Kingdom	The ship was driven ashore and severely damaged at Crail, Fife.
Queen	United Kingdom	The ship was driven ashore at Pesaro, Papal States. Her crew were rescued. She was refloated on 5 February and taken in to Ancona, Papal States.
Statesman	United Kingdom	The barque was driven ashore between Monk's Ferry and Woodside, Cheshire. She was on a voyage from Saint John, New Brunswick, British North America to Liverpool, Lancashire. She was refloated.
Ugie	United Kingdom	The brig ran aground on the Newcombe Sand, in the North Sea off the coast of Suffolk. She was refloated and taken in to Great Yarmouth, Norfolk in a leaky condition.
Wellington	United Kingdom	The schooner was driven ashore at Fleetwood, Lancashire. She was on a voyage from Fleetwood to Port Dinorwic, Caernarfonshire.

== Unknown date ==
List of shipwrecks: Unknown date in January 1858
Ship	State	Description
Admiral Collingwood	United Kingdom	The barque foundered off the Cape of Good Hope, Cape Colony before 8 January. Her crew were rescued by a French barque. She was on a voyage from Namaqualand to Swansea, Glamorgan.
American Lass	United Kingdom	The ship was driven ashore and wrecked at Cabo San Antonio, Cuba. She was on a voyage from London to New Orleans, Louisiana. United States.
Assunta	Austrian Empire	The ship was wrecked at Kiliya, Russia before 28 January.
Augustine Clara	France	The ship was driven ashore at Penrhyn Bay, Caernarfonshire, United Kingdom. She was refloated on 20 January and taken in to Holyhead, Anglesey, United Kingdom.
Emu	United Kingdom	The ship ran aground whilst on a voyage from Danzig to Poole, Dorset. She was refloated and taken in to Kristiansand, Norway.
Flash	United Kingdom	The ship was wrecked "on Smollen" on or before 24 January. Her crew were rescued. She was on a voyage from Riga, Russia to Londonderry.
George Metcalf	United Kingdom	The ship was wrecked in the Black Sea between 18 and 20 January. She was on a voyage from Taganrog, Russia to Falmouth, Cornwall or Queenstown, County Cork.
James Russell	United Kingdom	The full-rigged ship ran aground at the mouth of the Irrawaddy River.
Lockaber	United Kingdom	The ship was run down and sunk in the Swin by the steamship Iron Era (United Kingdom). Her crew were rescued. She was on a voyage from London to West Hartlepool, County Durham.
Naomi	(United Kingdom of Great Britain and Ireland) British North America	The brigantine was driven ashore at Porthcurno, Cornwall, United Kingdom. She was on a voyage from South Shields, County Durham to Salem, Massachusetts, United States.
Ocean Child	United Kingdom	The ship ran aground between 4 and 13 January whilst on a voyage from Danzig to Poole. She was refloated and taken in to Kristiansand.
Scotia	United Kingdom	The ship was driven ashore at Newburgh, Fife. She was refloated on 14 January and taken in to Newburgh.
Serampore	United States	The ship was driven ashore and wrecked. Her crew were rescued. She was on a voyage from New Orleans, Louisiana to Boston, Massachusetts.
Sir Robert Sale	United Kingdom	The ship ran aground on the Bishop's College Sand, in the Hooghly River before 9 January. She was on a voyage from Calcutta, India to London. She was refloated the next day and resumed her voyage.
Stemster	United Kingdom	The ship struck a sunken rock off Barra, Outer Hebrides and was damaged. She was on a voyage from Wick, Caithness to Limerick. She consequently put in to Stornoway, Isle of Lewis, Outer Hebrides.
