= Frenchman Bay Road =

Road in Albany, Western Australia

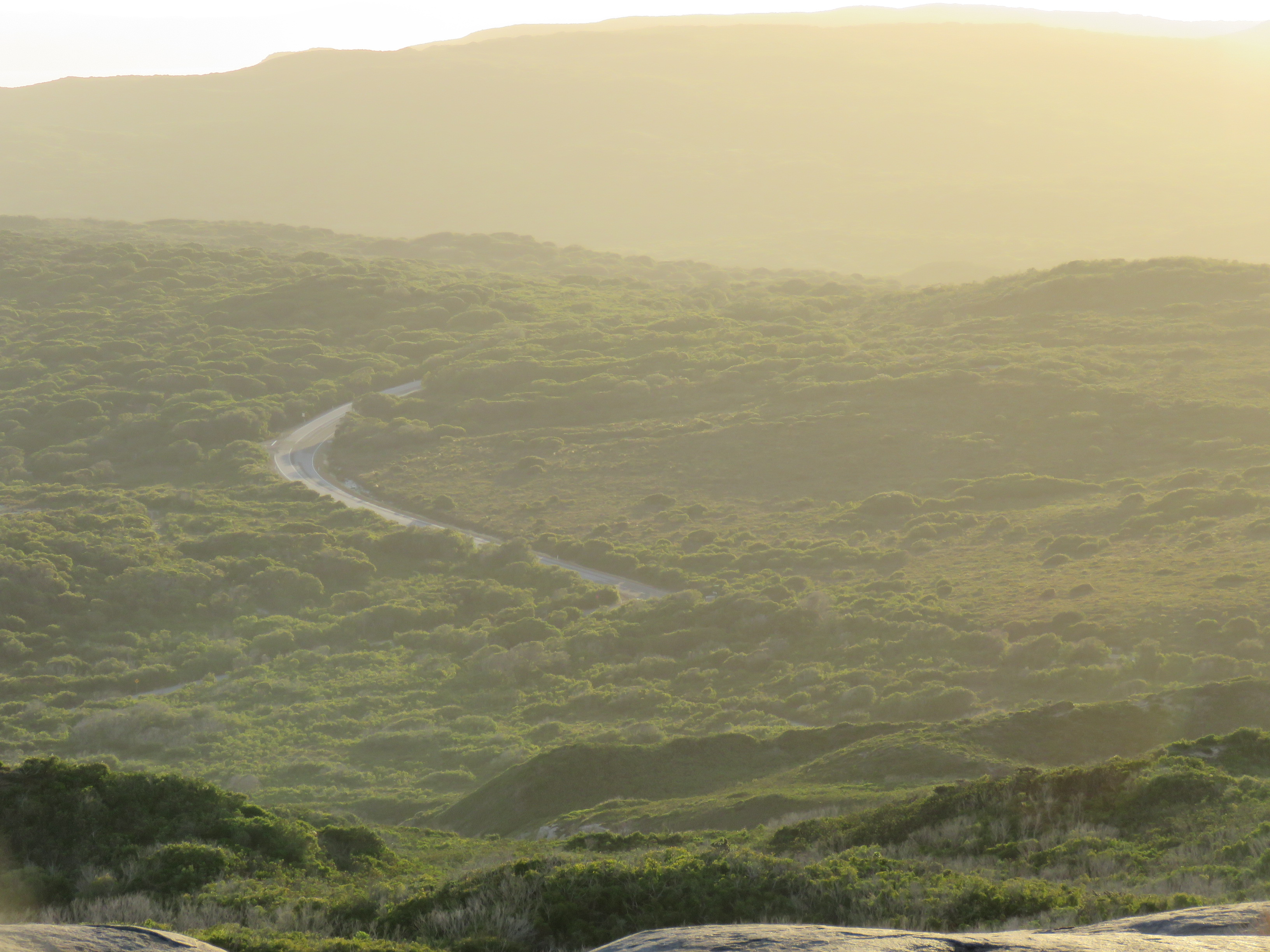
Frenchman Bay Road in Torndirrup National Park

Frenchman Bay Road (also found as Frenchmans Bay Road) is a road that runs south from Albany, Western Australia.

Commencing at an intersection with Princess Royal Drive at Mount Elphinstone it passes around the western and south side of the Princess Royal Harbour, through the suburbs of Robinson and Little Grove.

It enters into the Torndirrup National Park at Torndirrup, and through the park to Frenchman Bay, which lies in the open ocean area of the southern side of King George Sound.

It was made as a road in 1934.
