= Eclipse Island Lighthouse =

Lighthouse on south coast of Western Australia

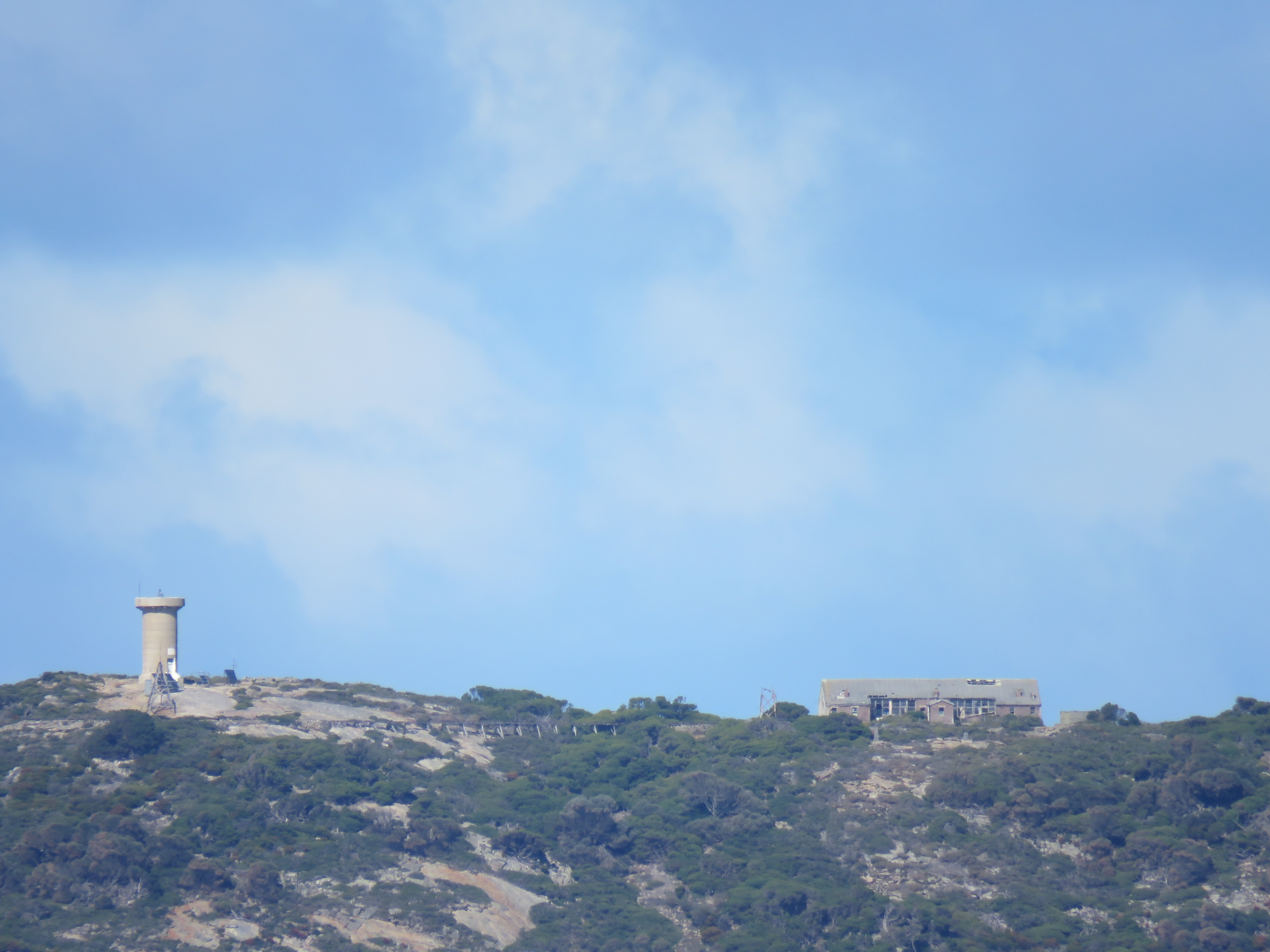
- Eclipse Island Lighthouse in April 2022
- Location: Eclipse Island; Albany, Western Australia; Western Australia
- Coordinates: 35°10′50.4″S 117°53′17.1″E

Tower
- Constructed: 1926
- Construction: concrete tower
- Automated: 1976
- Height: 14 metres (46 ft)
- Shape: cylindrical tower with lantern removed in 1976
- Markings: unpainted tower, with beacon installed in 1976
- Power source: solar power
- Operator: Australian Maritime Safety Authority
- Heritage: State Registered Place

Light
- Focal height: 119 metres (390 ft)
- Intensity: 17,000 cd
- Range: 15 nautical miles (28 km; 17 mi)
- Characteristic: FI (3) W 12s.

Western Australia Heritage Register
- Type: State Registered Place
- Designated: 30 August 2002
- Reference no.: 15740

Eclipse Island Lighthouse is an active lighthouse in Eclipse Island off the south coast of Western Australia

== History ==
It was built in 1926 as a cylindrical tower made of concrete. Initially, it was a staffed light using kerosene as lantern fuel in combination with a first order Fresnel lens. In 1976 the lantern was completely removed and the optic was put on display at the Western Australian Museum. Today the light is emitted from atop a mast on the lighthouse's concrete trunk. The characteristic is a group of three flashes every twelve seconds from a focal plane at 117 metres (384 ft) above sea level.

Three family quarters made of brick with fibro roofing along with several outbuildings, concrete tanks and bases, generator shed, helipad and a concrete landing can be found around the lighthouse. A trestle based light gauge railway and cable towers are also found in the lighthouse precinct, and was all constructed during the interwar period.

== See also ==
- List of lighthouses in Australia
- List of places on the State Register of Heritage Places in the City of Albany
