= Ataturk Channel =

Harbour entrance in Albany, Western Australia

- Ataturk Entrance
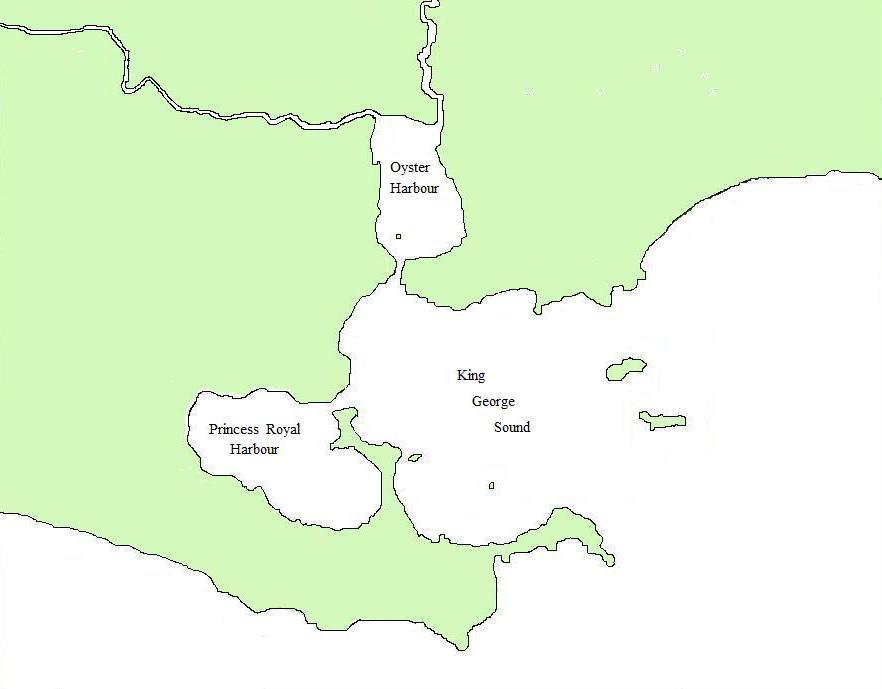
- The location of Ataturk Channel at King George Sound leading to Princess Royal Harbour.

- Location within Australia
- Location: South coast of Western Australia
- Coordinates: 35.03883°S 117.91617°E
- Type: Water channel
- Etymology: Mustafa Kemal Atatürk (1881-1938), founder and first president of Turkey, who fought at Gallipoli campaign against ANZAC.
- Part of: King George Sound
- Ocean/sea sources: Indian Ocean
- Settlements: Albany

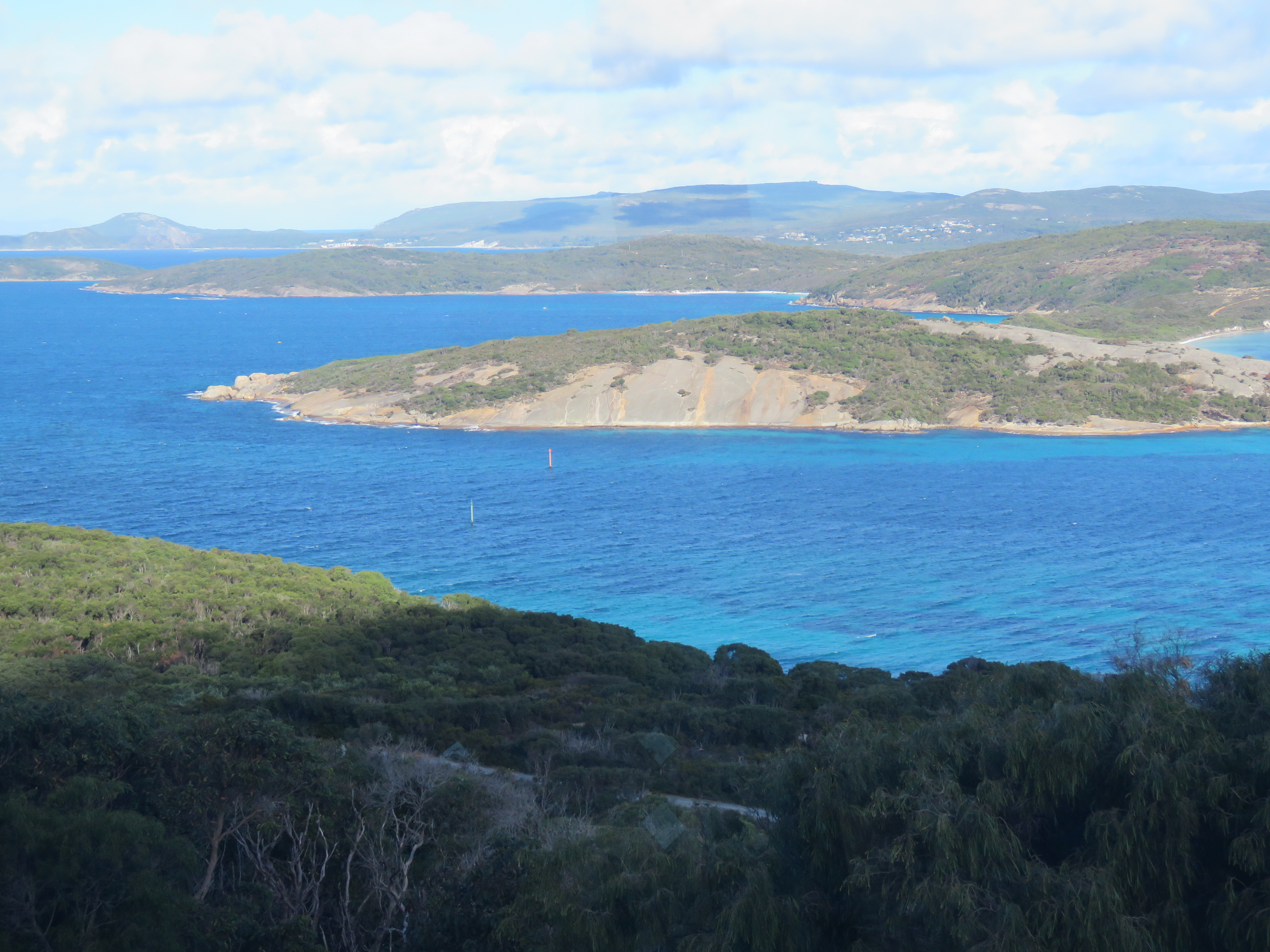
A view of Ataturk Channel

Atatürk Channel, also known as Atatürk Entrance, is a water channel named after Mustafa Kemal Atatürk and located at King George Sound leading to Princess Royal Harbour in Albany on the south coast of Western Australia.

The water channel was officially renamed in 1985 after Mustafa Kemal Atatürk (1881-1938) in exchange for naming the landing beach of the Australian and New Zealand Army Corps (ANZAC) troops during the Gallipoli campaign of World War I in 1915, as ANZAC Cove in Turkey. Mustafa Kemal Atatürk, the founder and the first president of the Republic of Turkey in 1923, fought at the Gallipoli campaign against ANZAC. Ataturk Channel is wide and deep enough to allow navigation of large ships into the Princess Royal Harbour.

A life-sized standing statue of Atatürk overlooking to the channel named after him was erected in 2002. The memorial is accessible walking along Stirling Terrace or from the Middleton Beach.
