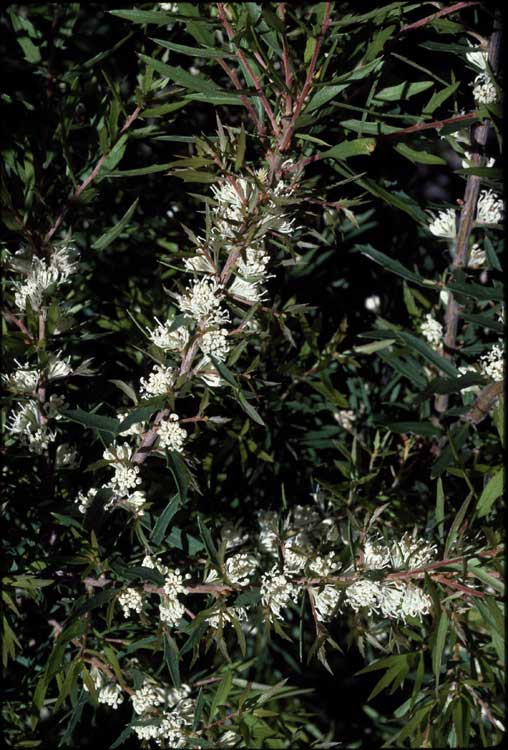
- Hakea florida in the ANBG

Scientific classification
- Kingdom: Plantae
- Clade: Tracheophytes
- Clade: Angiosperms
- Clade: Eudicots
- Order: Proteales
- Family: Proteaceae
- Genus: Hakea
- Species: H. florida

Binomial name
- Hakea florida R.Br.
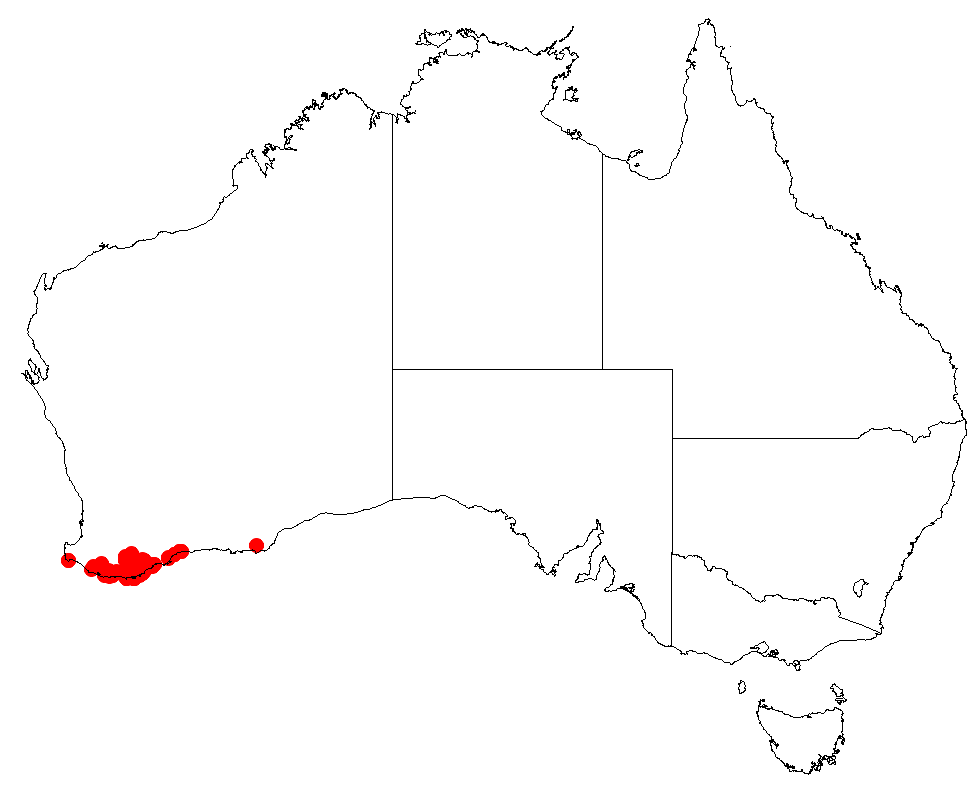
- Occurrence data from AVH

= Hakea florida =

Species of shrub endemic to Western Australia

Hakea florida is a shrub in the family Proteaceae. It is endemic to an area along the south coast in the South West, Great Southern and Goldfields–Esperance regions of Western Australia.

== Description ==
The erect, prickly, bushy shrub typically grows to a height of 0.9 to 2.5 metres (3.0 to 8.2 ft) with smooth soft grey bark. Profuse blooms appear from October to January and produces strongly scented white-cream flowers in the leaf axils. The sharp pointed leaves are sparse, widely spaced, thick and linear-lanceolate with a central vein. The warty fruit are large and rounded up to 2–3 cm (0.8–1 in) long and 2.5 cm (1 in) wide, ending in two distinct horns. A very showy shrub in full bloom.

== Taxonomy and naming ==
Hakea florida was first formally described in 1810 by Robert Brown and the description was published in Transactions of the Linnean Society of London. It is named from the Latin fluorides-many flowered, referring to the profuse showy flowers.

== Distribution and habitat ==
Occurs from Manjimup south coast to Denmark east to the Fitzgerald River National Park. Hakea florida grows on sand, loam, clayey sand, gravel, laterite and granite. May be grown in sun or semi-shade, it is frost and drought tolerant.

== Conservation status ==
Hakea florida is classified as "not threatened" by the Western Australian Government.
