= D'Entrecasteaux National Park =

National park in Western Australia

- IUCN category II (national park)
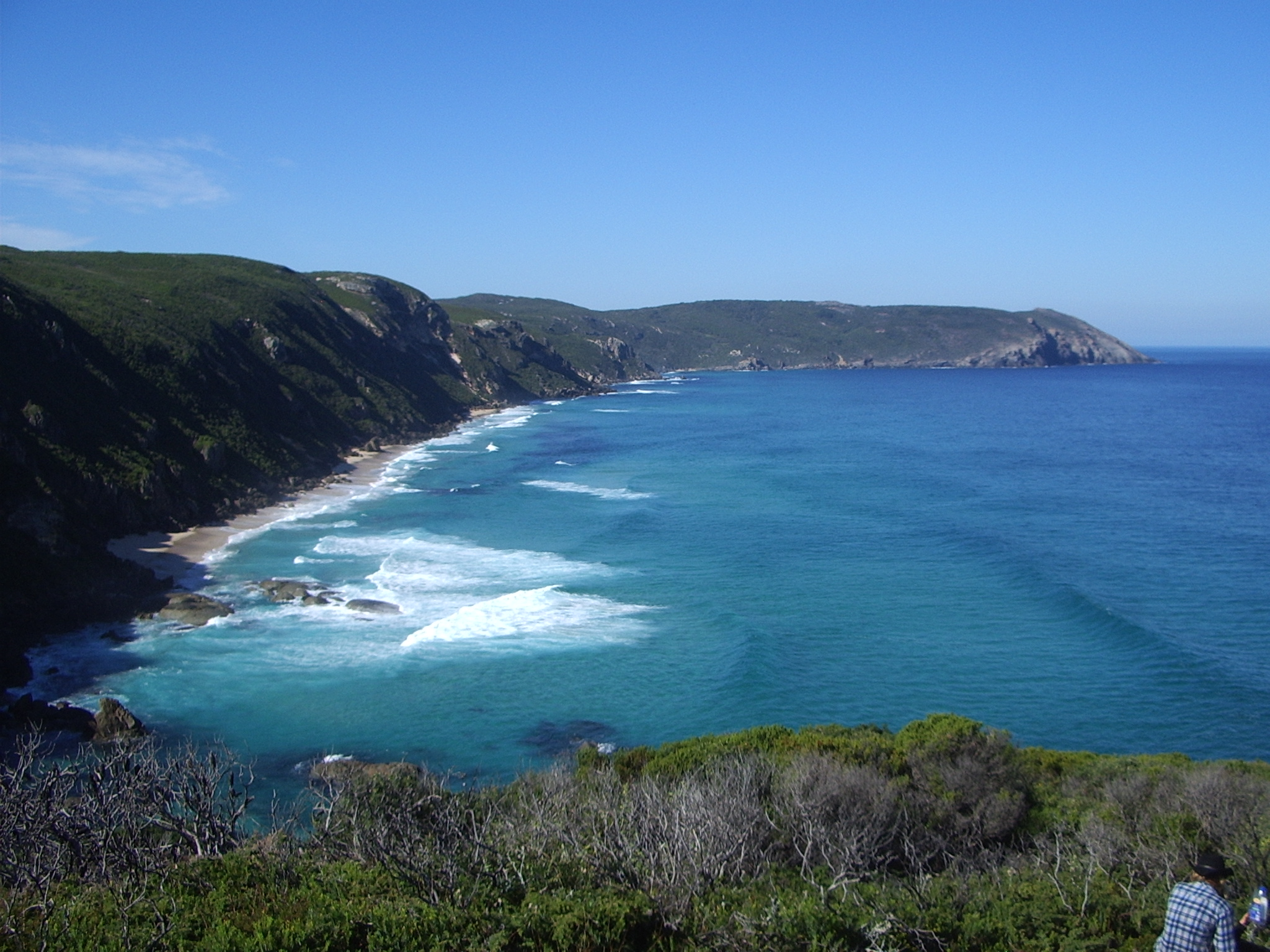
- Near Long Point, D'Entrecasteaux National Park

- Location within Western Australia
- Location: Western Australia
- Nearest city: Manjimup
- Coordinates: 34°44′49″S 116°06′54″E
- Area: 1,187.79 km^{2} (458.61 sq mi)
- Established: 1980
- Governing body: Department of Environment and Conservation
- Website: dec.wa.gov.au/park-finder/property/national-parks/d-entrecasteaux-national-park.html

D'Entrecasteaux National Park is a national park in Western Australia, 315 kilometres (196 mi) south of Perth. The park is named after the French Admiral Antoine Bruni d'Entrecasteaux who was the first European to sight the area and name Point D'Entrecasteaux in 1792. The park received 168,497 visitors through 2008–2009.

== Description ==
The park stretches 130 km (81 mi) from Black Point in the west to Long Point in the east and extends inland as far as 20 km (12 mi). Black Point is made of basalt columns from a lava flow that occurred 135 million years ago. An interesting feature in the park is Yeagarup dune, a mobile 10-kilometre (6.2 mi) long sand dune found to the west of Lake Jasper.

The park contains a great variety of scenery, including beaches, sand-dunes, coastal cliffs, coastal heath and pockets of karri forest. Rivers such as the Warren, the Donnelly and the Shannon flow through the park and discharge into the waters off-shore.

Important large scale wetlands, known as the Blackwater, and lakes such as Lake Jasper and Lake Yeagarup are found within the park boundaries.

Broke Inlet is contained within the park boundaries at the eastern end; it is the only inlet in the South West that has not been significantly altered within the catchment area. The gneiss basement rocks project through the shallow waters to form small islands in the Inlet.

Sandy Island in Windy Harbour is part of the park; it is an important nesting site for seabirds, with up to 300,000 breeding pairs of flesh-footed shearwaters, a high proportion of the global population.

== Facilities ==
The park has an entry fee that applies to all visitors. Facilities available to visitors include barbecues, toilets, 4WD tracks, camp sites, disabled access and picnic areas. Canoeing facilities also exist within the park on the Deep River. Rangers regularly patrol the area.

The Bibbulmun Track passes through the park area.

The outdoor education organisation, Outward Bound, operate within the park taking school groups on hiking expeditions.

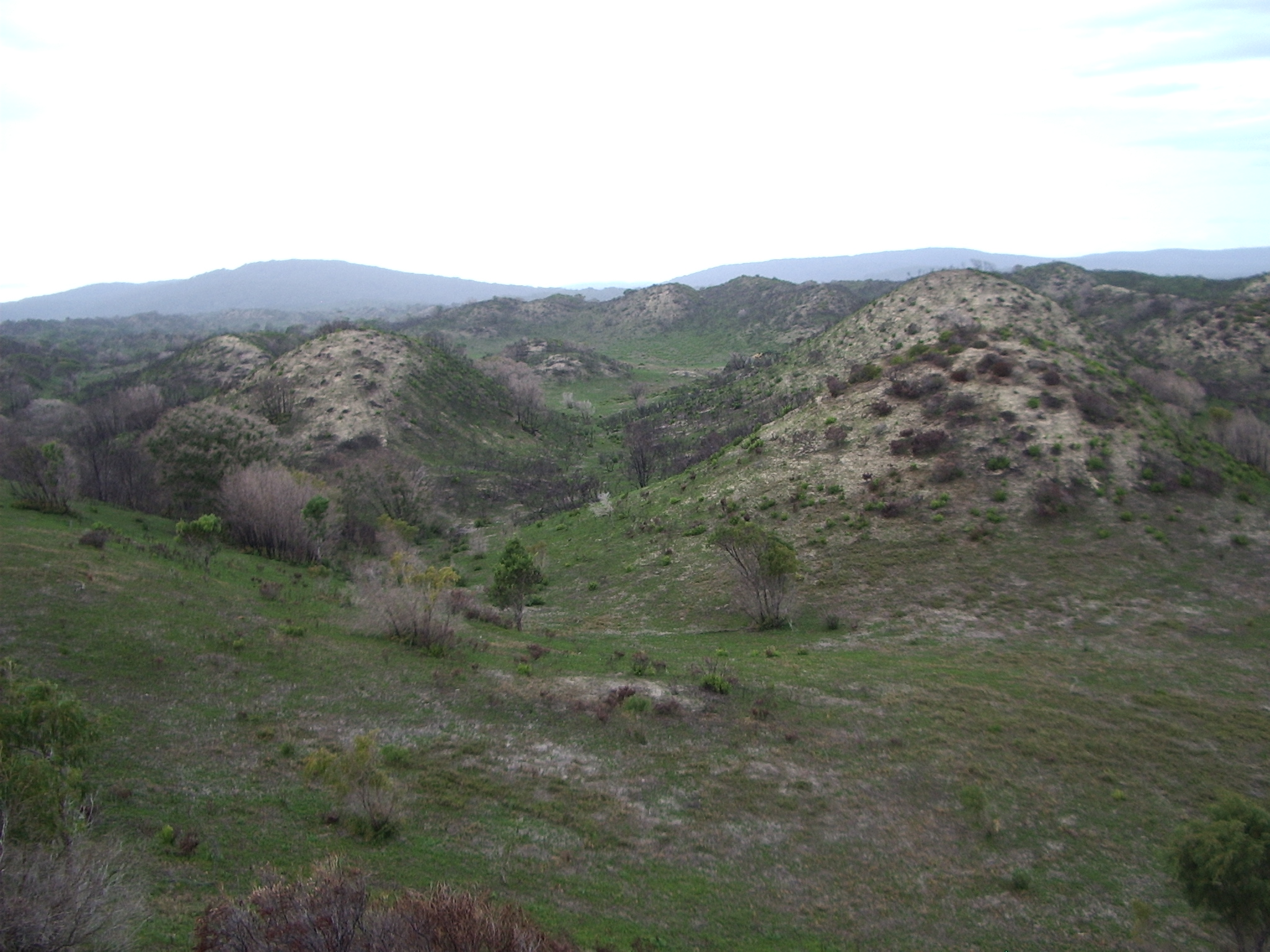
Vegetated Dune, D'Entrecasteaux National Park

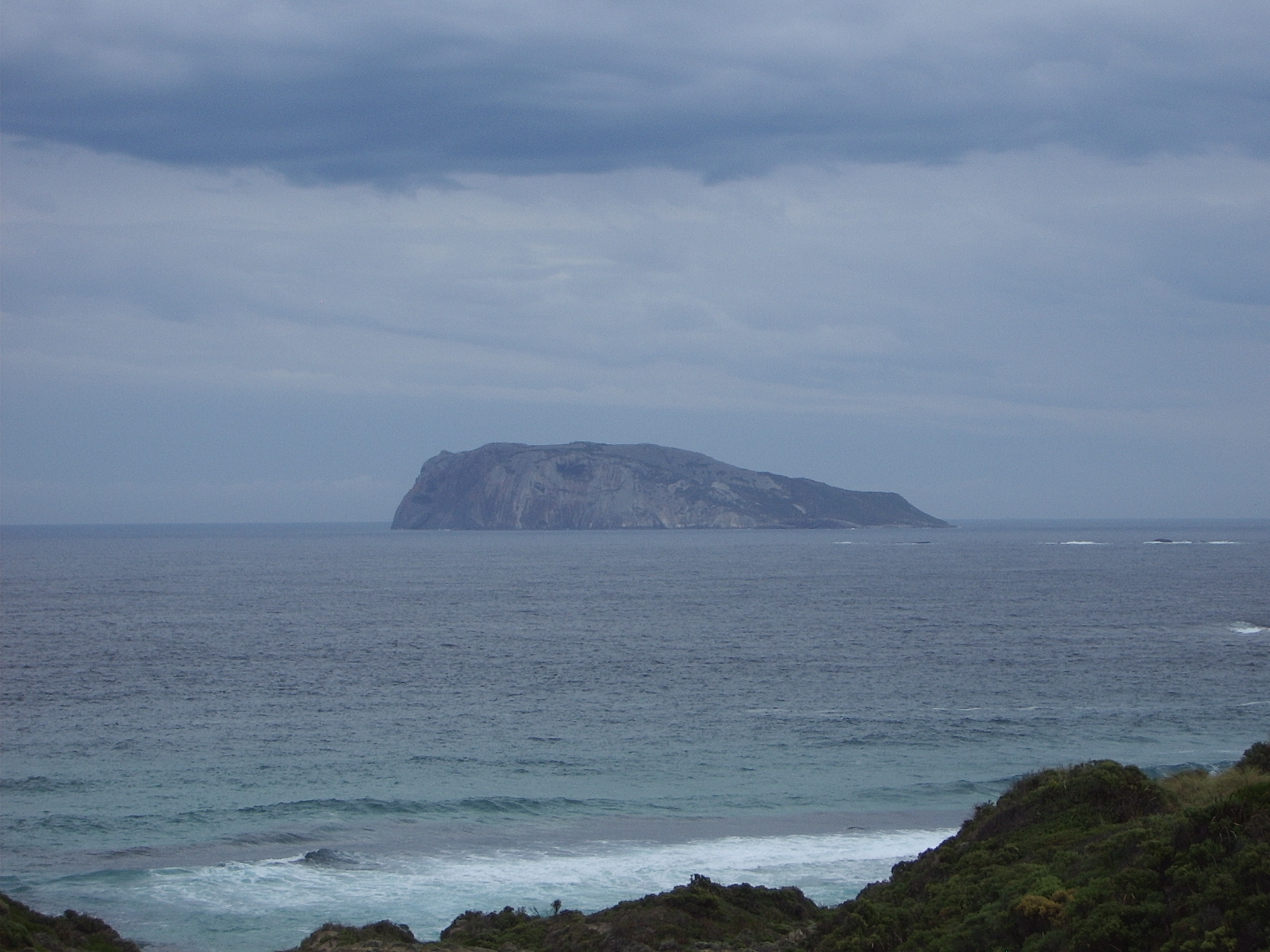
Chatham Island from Long Point in D'Entrecasteaux National Park

== See also ==
- Protected areas of Western Australia
- Quagering Island
