= Eclipse Island (Western Australia) =

Island in Western Australia

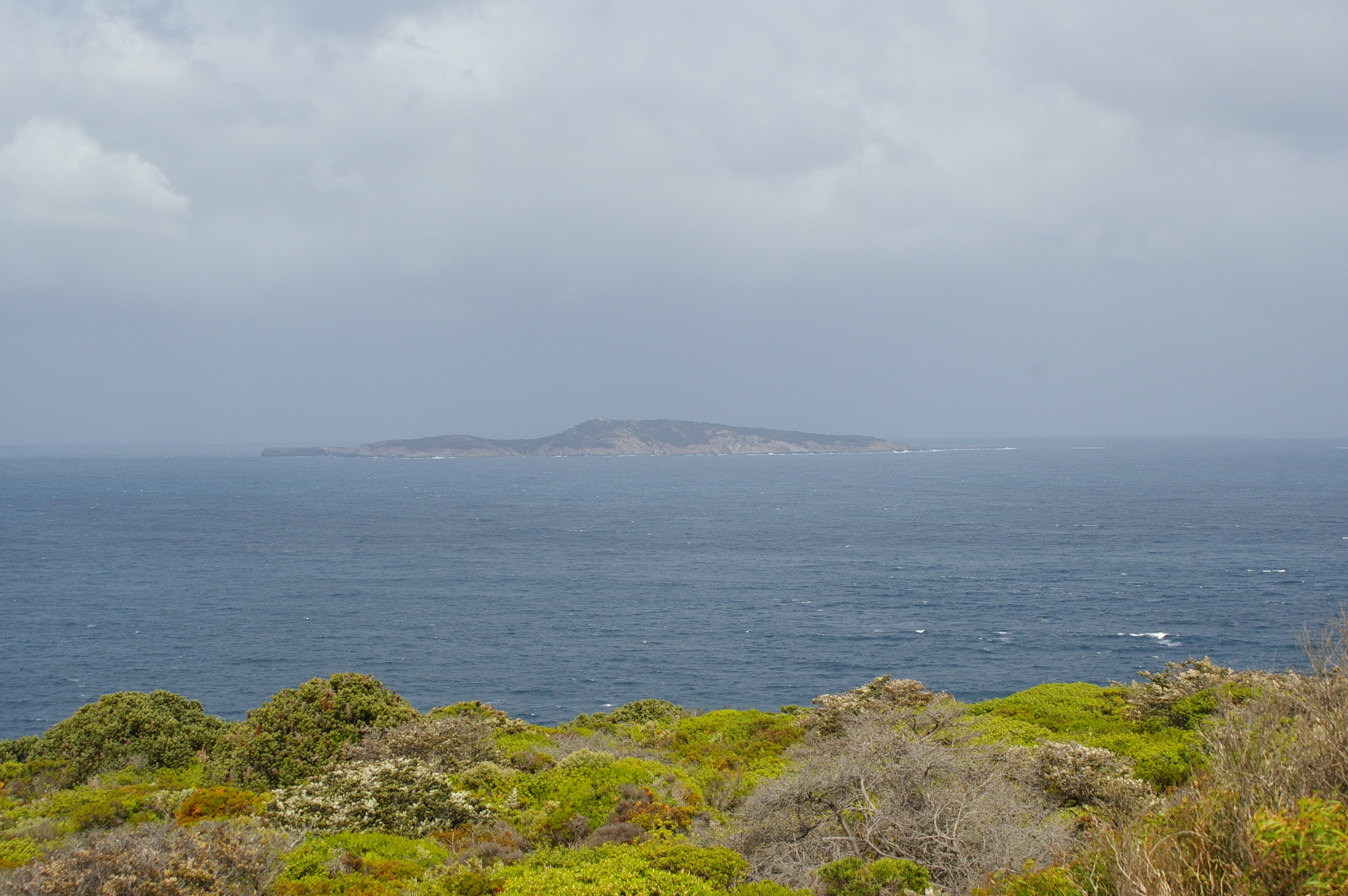
- Eclipse Island from near the Blowholes at Torndirrup National Park

Geography
- Coordinates: 35°10′58″S 117°53′12″E

Administration
- Australia

Eclipse Island is a barren island in Western Australia, 17 kilometres (10.6 mi) due south of Albany, and 6.1 km (3.8 mi) south of the nearest point of the mainland coast, which is Cave Point on the southern coast of Torndirrup Peninsula. Eclipse Island Lighthouse is located near the centre of the island. Nearby South West Island contains Western Australia's southernmost landmass.

== Naming ==
The island was named for an observation on 28 September 1791 by Captain George Vancouver "observed this Wednesday morning a partial solar eclipse. He went on the name the barren rocky cluster of isles."

The island supports a large colony of introduced rabbits and another common introduced pest the arum lily has also been introduced to the island in the past.

The island is composed of granite and has a total area of 99 hectares (245 acres) and was declared a Class 1A Nature Reserve in 2000. It is a waypoint for the Volvo Ocean Race.

The island has a landing stage that is 30 feet (9 m) above the water line to service the 360 feet (110 m) lighthouse which also houses Western Australia's most southerly weather recording station. In 1950 four families were living on the island.

== Birds ==
The island has been classified as an Important Bird Area because it has been reported as supporting over 1% of the world's breeding population of flesh-footed shearwaters (6000-8000 pairs) and great-winged petrels (10,000-15,000 pairs). Other birds that are found on the island include wedge-tailed shearwaters, little shearwaters, Caspian terns and Pacific gulls.

== Climate ==
Greatly exposed to the westerly storm track, Eclipse Island has extraordinarily cool summers for its latitude at a little over 35 degrees south, perhaps among the coolest in the world. Summer mean temperatures closely resemble those in London, more than 16 degrees farther from the equator. It rains on 181 days of the year with a large concentration in the winter months.

The annual mean temperature of 15.7 °C (60.3 °F), is also markedly cool for its latitude; about one and a half degrees cooler than North American climates at this corresponding latitude, and more than four degrees cooler than in the Mediterranean of southern Europe.

Climate data for Eclipse Island (35.18° S, 117.88° E)
Month	Jan	Feb	Mar	Apr	May	Jun	Jul	Aug	Sep	Oct	Nov	Dec	Year
Mean daily maximum °C (°F)	21.8 (71.2)	21.9 (71.4)	21.2 (70.2)	19.8 (67.6)	17.9 (64.2)	16.2 (61.2)	15.1 (59.2)	15.4 (59.7)	16.1 (61.0)	17.3 (63.1)	18.9 (66.0)	20.5 (68.9)	18.5 (65.3)
Mean daily minimum °C (°F)	15.6 (60.1)	15.9 (60.6)	15.5 (59.9)	14.3 (57.7)	12.8 (55.0)	11.3 (52.3)	10.2 (50.4)	9.9 (49.8)	10.5 (50.9)	11.3 (52.3)	12.8 (55.0)	14.3 (57.7)	12.9 (55.1)
Average precipitation mm (inches)	22.6 (0.89)	15.7 (0.62)	33.1 (1.30)	69.1 (2.72)	118.9 (4.68)	148.6 (5.85)	168.7 (6.64)	134.4 (5.29)	99.9 (3.93)	70.6 (2.78)	39.2 (1.54)	28.3 (1.11)	949.1 (37.35)
Average precipitation days (≥ 0.2 mm)	7.6	6.5	10.5	14.5	19.5	20.9	22.7	21.9	19.2	16.9	11.9	9.0	181.1
Average afternoon relative humidity (%)	68	70	71	74	73	75	74	72	73	73	71	70	72
Average dew point °C (°F)	14.2 (57.6)	14.9 (58.8)	14.4 (57.9)	13.3 (55.9)	12.0 (53.6)	11.0 (51.8)	9.4 (48.9)	9.2 (48.6)	9.8 (49.6)	11.1 (52.0)	11.9 (53.4)	13.1 (55.6)	12.0 (53.6)
Source: Australian Bureau of Meteorology; Eclipse Island
