= Quagering Island =

Island of Western Australia

Coordinates: 34°50′57.5″S 115°59′45.4″E

Quagering Island (also known as Flat Island) is an island off the south coast of Western Australia, located near Windy Harbour. Along with Sandy Island, it makes up the Quagering Nature Reserve.

== See also ==
- D'Entrecasteaux National Park
- The Cow and The Calf
