= Windy Harbour, Western Australia =

Community in Western Australia

Windy Harbour
- Town
- Interactive map of Windy Harbour
- Coordinates: 34.7921°S 116.0713°E
- Country: Australia
- State: Western Australia
- LGA: Shire of Manjimup

Government
  - State electorate: Warren-Blackwood
  - Federal division: O'Connor

Area
  - Total: 217.9 km^{2} (84.1 sq mi)
- Elevation: 13 m (43 ft)

Population
  - Total: 30 (SAL 2021)
- Mean max temp: 20.3 °C (68.5 °F)
- Mean min temp: 11.5 °C (52.7 °F)
- Annual rainfall: 1,061.5 mm (41.79 in)
Localities around Windy Harbour
Southern Ocean	Meerup	Boorara Brook
Southern Ocean	Windy Harbour	Broke
Southern Ocean	Southern Ocean	Southern Ocean

Windy Harbour is a rural locality of the Shire of Manjimup in the South West region of Western Australia. It is surrounded by D’Entrecasteaux National Park. It is located 27 km south of Northcliffe, on the south coast of Western Australia east of Augusta and west of Nornalup. It lies just east of Point D'Entrecasteaux.

Fishing, snorkelling and whale watching are the major attractions of Windy Harbour.

== Coastal zone ==
The area of Windy Harbour coastal zone was studied before it became part of the national park.

== Settlement ==
The history of the settlement is tied in with the forestry communities inland from the harbour and the rock lobster fishing industry.

The area was also the location of coastal fishing huts, which have been at times removed due to their not being approved by local authorities.

== Climate ==
Windy Harbour possesses a warm-summer mediterranean climate (Köppen: Csb) with tepid, dry summers and mild, very wet winters. Average maxima vary from 23.7 °C (74.7 °F) in February to 16.8 °C (62.2 °F) in July, while average minima fluctuate between 14.7 °C (58.5 °F) in February and 8.7 °C (47.7 °F) in July. Precipitation is moderately abundant, as the locality averages 1,061.5 mm (41.79 in) of rain per annum. Rainfall is frequent, as it is distributed over 176.1 precipitation days. The locality is not sunny, receiving 129.0 cloudy days and only 42.6 clear days annually. Extreme temperatures have ranged from 40.3 °C (104.5 °F) on 7 March 2007 to −0.5 °C (31.1 °F) on 5 June 2022.

Climate data for Windy Harbour (34.84°S 116.03°E) (5 m (16 ft) AMSL) (normals 1991-2020; extremes 1984-present)
Month	Jan	Feb	Mar	Apr	May	Jun	Jul	Aug	Sep	Oct	Nov	Dec	Year
Record high °C (°F)	39.5 (103.1)	39.8 (103.6)	40.3 (104.5)	34.5 (94.1)	30.2 (86.4)	24.7 (76.5)	22.7 (72.9)	25.1 (77.2)	29.4 (84.9)	30.9 (87.6)	37.2 (99.0)	38.0 (100.4)	40.3 (104.5)
Mean maximum °C (°F)	29.7 (85.5)	31.8 (89.2)	33.3 (91.9)	28.8 (83.8)	25.5 (77.9)	21.4 (70.5)	20.6 (69.1)	21.0 (69.8)	22.9 (73.2)	25.7 (78.3)	28.7 (83.7)	29.1 (84.4)	35.8 (96.4)
Mean daily maximum °C (°F)	23.2 (73.8)	23.7 (74.7)	23.5 (74.3)	22.0 (71.6)	19.9 (67.8)	17.8 (64.0)	16.9 (62.4)	17.0 (62.6)	17.7 (63.9)	19.0 (66.2)	21.0 (69.8)	22.1 (71.8)	20.3 (68.6)
Daily mean °C (°F)	18.8 (65.8)	19.2 (66.6)	18.7 (65.7)	17.2 (63.0)	15.3 (59.5)	13.6 (56.5)	12.8 (55.0)	13.0 (55.4)	13.6 (56.5)	14.8 (58.6)	16.4 (61.5)	17.6 (63.7)	15.9 (60.7)
Mean daily minimum °C (°F)	14.3 (57.7)	14.7 (58.5)	13.8 (56.8)	12.3 (54.1)	10.6 (51.1)	9.4 (48.9)	8.7 (47.7)	8.9 (48.0)	9.4 (48.9)	10.5 (50.9)	11.7 (53.1)	13.0 (55.4)	11.4 (52.6)
Mean minimum °C (°F)	8.0 (46.4)	8.6 (47.5)	7.1 (44.8)	6.2 (43.2)	4.9 (40.8)	3.8 (38.8)	3.0 (37.4)	4.0 (39.2)	4.3 (39.7)	5.1 (41.2)	6.7 (44.1)	7.3 (45.1)	2.2 (36.0)
Record low °C (°F)	6.5 (43.7)	5.0 (41.0)	3.5 (38.3)	4.3 (39.7)	1.7 (35.1)	−0.5 (31.1)	0.7 (33.3)	1.5 (34.7)	1.5 (34.7)	3.8 (38.8)	4.0 (39.2)	4.5 (40.1)	−0.5 (31.1)
Average precipitation mm (inches)	17.4 (0.69)	12.0 (0.47)	29.6 (1.17)	60.9 (2.40)	143.6 (5.65)	169.8 (6.69)	203.7 (8.02)	163.3 (6.43)	118.0 (4.65)	63.0 (2.48)	40.3 (1.59)	27.5 (1.08)	1,049.1 (41.32)
Average precipitation days	6.0	6.4	8.6	13.4	18.7	21.0	23.3	23.4	20.9	15.3	11.2	8.2	176.4
Average afternoon relative humidity (%)	74	72	76	74	72	75	74	73	74	74	74	75	74
Average dew point °C (°F)	15.9 (60.6)	16.2 (61.2)	16.1 (61.0)	14.7 (58.5)	12.8 (55.0)	11.3 (52.3)	10.5 (50.9)	10.2 (50.4)	10.9 (51.6)	11.9 (53.4)	13.8 (56.8)	15.0 (59.0)	13.3 (55.9)
Source: Bureau of Meteorology (1984-2024 data)

== See also ==
- Sandy Island (Windy Harbour)
- Quagering Island
- Mount Chudalup
- The Cow and The Calf
