= Sandy Island (Windy Harbour) =

Island in Western Australia

Coordinates: 34°51′59″S 116°02′22″E

Location of Sandy Island (Windy Harbour)

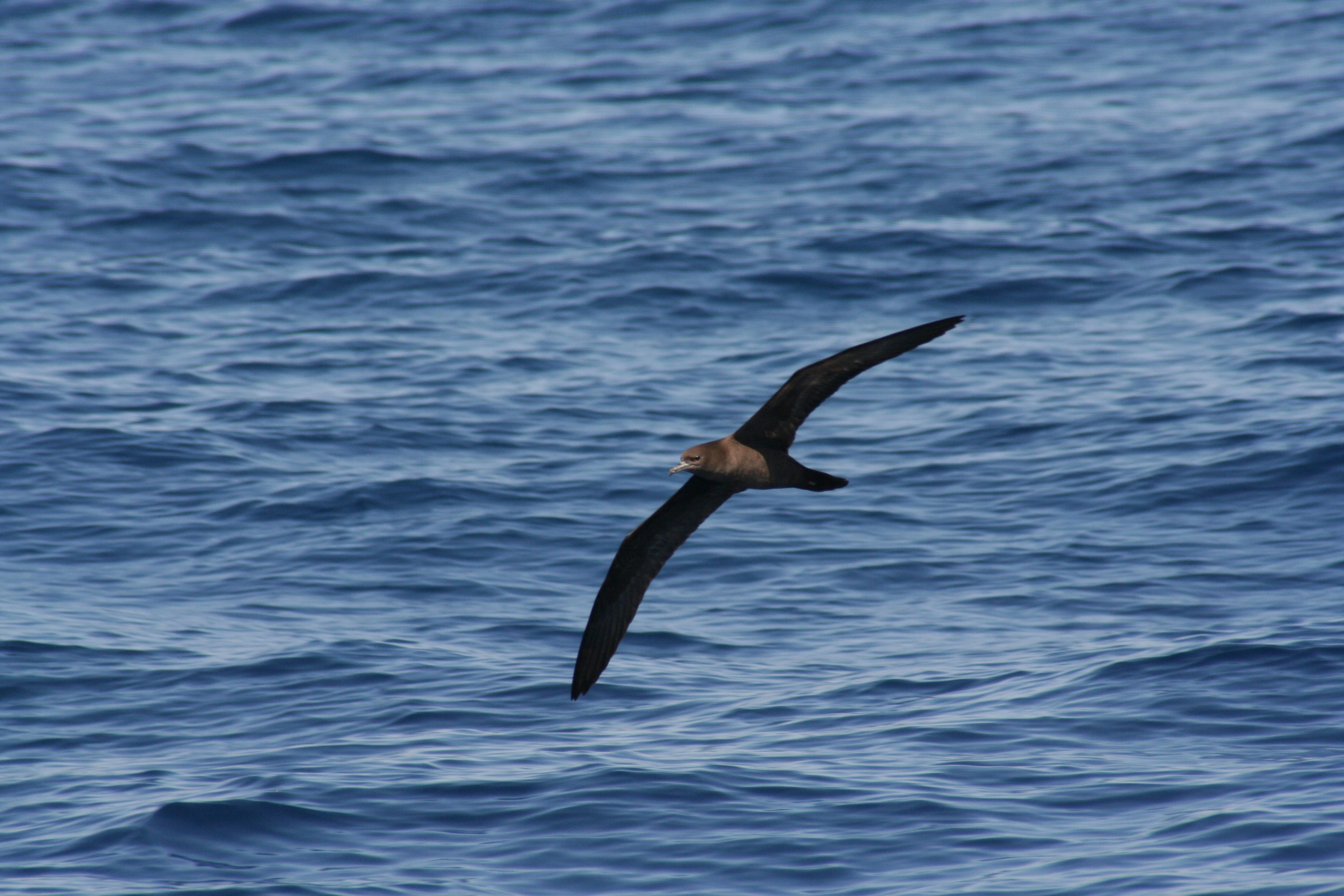
The island is an important breeding site for flesh-footed shearwaters

Sandy Island is a 20 ha (49 acres) island lying about 5 km (3.1 mi) off the coast of Windy Harbour in south-west Western Australia, and near Point D'Entrecasteaux. It is part of D'Entrecasteaux National Park and is an important breeding site for seabirds.

== Description ==
The island is aligned north-west to south-east, about 800 m (2,600 ft) long by 300 m (980 ft) wide, flat and mainly sandy. There is an area of limestone and unconsolidated dune at the north-western end. The southern coastline is composed of migmatitic rocks. Most of the island is vegetated with Poa tussock grassland, pigface and Lobelia anceps. Some 46 plant species have been recorded.

== Birds ==
The island has been identified by BirdLife International as an Important Bird Area because it supports a high proportion of the nesting population of flesh-footed shearwaters (with up to 300,000 breeding pairs). It has supported relatively high numbers of breeding fairy terns. Other birds recorded breeding on the island are little shearwaters, sooty oystercatchers and silver gulls.

== See also ==
- Quagering Island
