= Little Grove, Western Australia =

Suburb of the City of Albany, Western Australia

Little Grove
- Suburb
- Interactive map of Little Grove
- Coordinates: 35.07°S 117.87°E
- Country: Australia
- State: Western Australia
- City: Albany
- LGA: City of Albany
- Location: 9 km (5.6 mi) from Albany

Government
  - State electorate: Albany
  - Federal division: O'Connor

Area
  - Total: 4 km^{2} (1.5 sq mi)

Population
  - Total: 1,508 (SAL 2021)
- Time zone: UTC+8 (AWST)
- Postcode: 6330

Little Grove is a southern suburb of the City of Albany in the Great Southern region of Western Australia. The suburb is bounded by the Princess Royal Harbour to the north and west.

Little Grove is situated on a peninsula south of Princess Royal Harbour. Directly across the harbour is Albany's central business district. Little Grove borders Torndirrup National Park in the east.

It has been the location of sporting activities early in the history of Albany, with access by boats from across the harbour.

Frenchman Bay Road passes through the suburb.
