= Princess Royal Harbour =

Bay in Western Australia

- Mamang Koort (Menang Noongar)
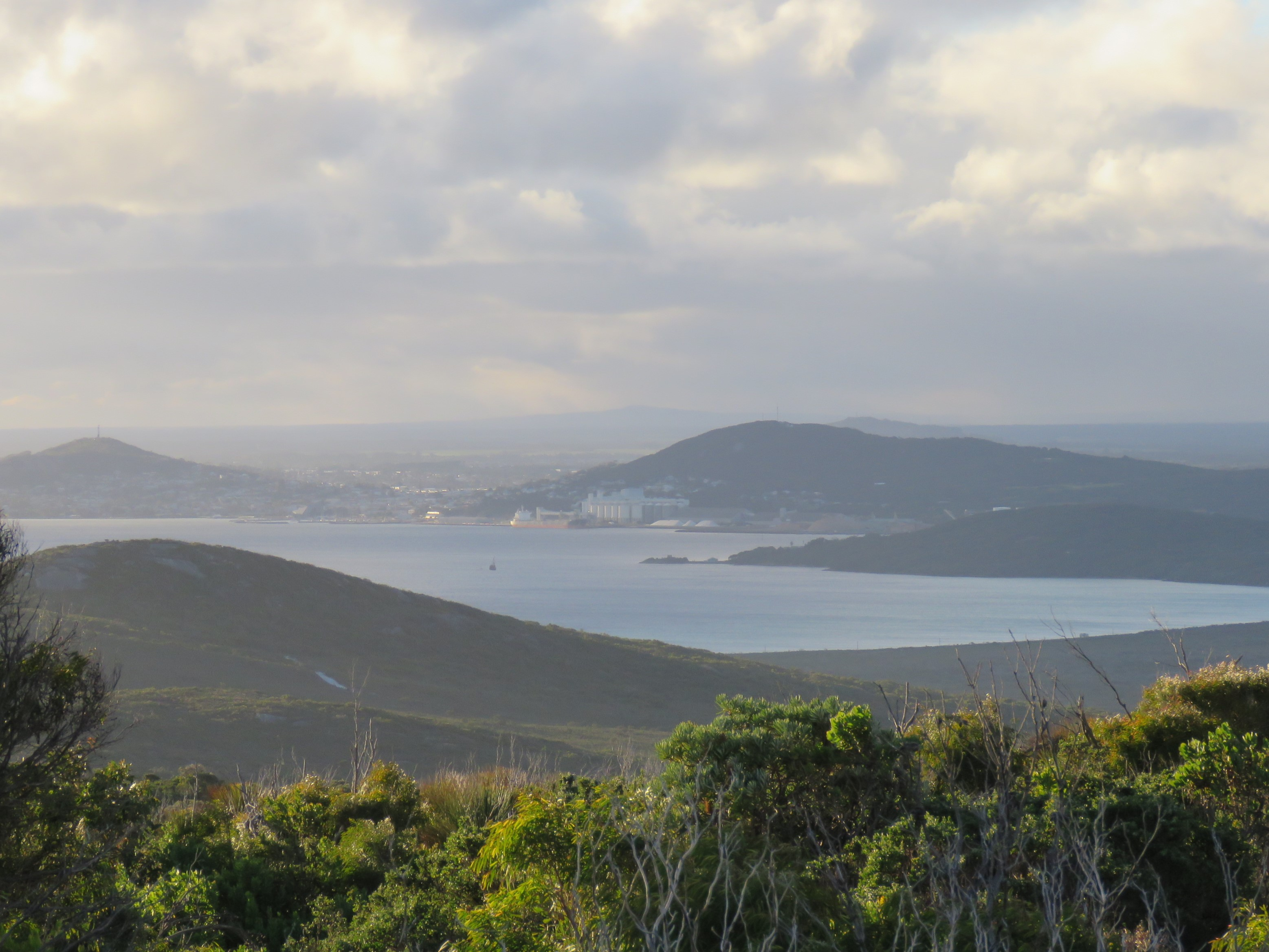
- The harbour in 2022
- Interactive map of Princess Royal Harbour
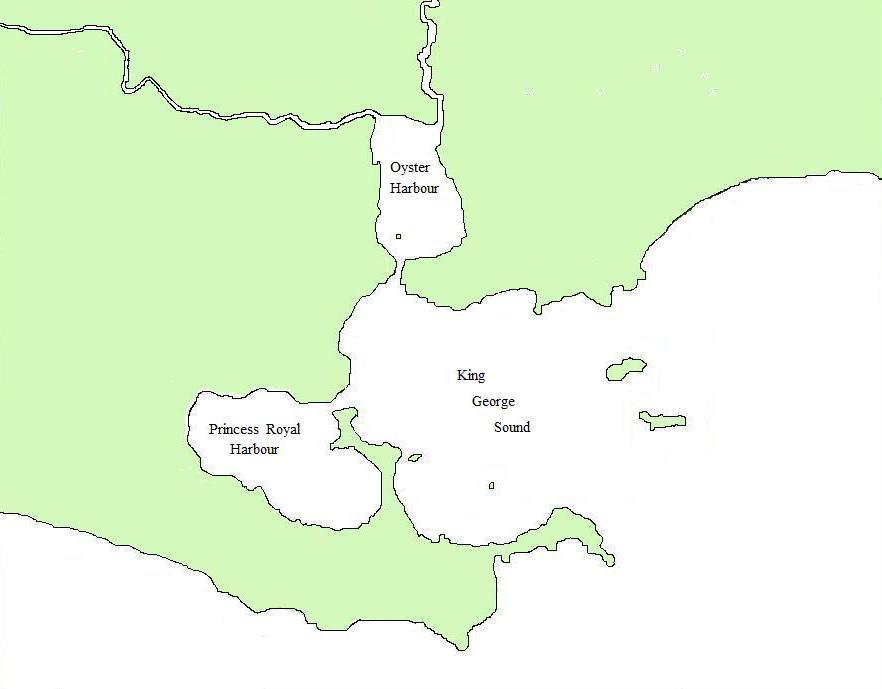
- Location relative to King George Sound
- Location: Albany, Western Australia
- Coordinates: 35°S 118°E
- Type: Harbour
- Etymology: Charlotte, Princess Royal
- Part of: King George Sound
- Ocean/sea sources: Indian Ocean
- Max. length: 8 km (5.0 mi) (NW to SE)
- Max. width: 4 km (2.5 mi)
- Surface area: 28.8 km^{2} (11.1 sq mi)
- Settlements: Albany; Big Grove; Little Grove; Robinson; Torndirrup

Princess Royal Harbour (Menang Noongar: Mamang Koort) is a part of King George Sound on the south coast of Western Australia, and harbour to Albany. On its northern shore is the Port of Albany. The name Princess Royal also appears in Albany in Princess Royal Fortress and Princess Royal Drive.

== History ==
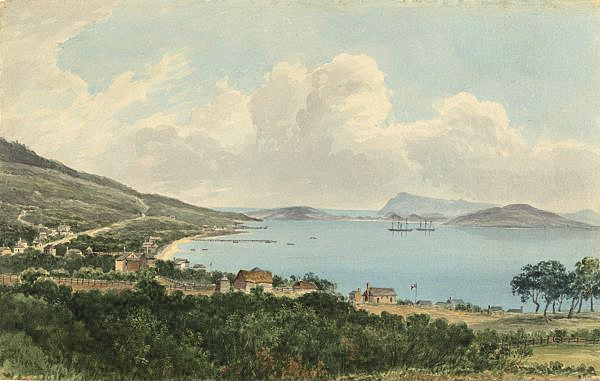
Princess Royal Harbour, 1854, watercolour by Duncan Cooper

The first European to explore the waters was George Vancouver on HMS Discovery in September 1791; he named the harbour after Princess Charlotte Augusta Matilda, the first daughter and fourth child of King George III.

The harbour was surveyed by Matthew Flinders in 1802, Jules Dumont d'Urville in 1826, John Lort Stokes in 1848, and Henry Mangles Denham in 1858.

The harbour was less than 2 metres (6 ft 7 in) deep until it was dredged in 1901, and its entrance was dredged in 1952.

Princess Royal Harbour was the departure location for a large convoy of Australian troops in November 1914.

The entrance to the harbour was named Ataturk Channel in 1985 for Mustafa Kemal Atatürk; it is also known as Atatürk Entrance.

== Geography ==
Princess Royal Harbour is an almost landlocked extension of King George Sound on the south coast of Western Australia. Roughly elliptical in shape, it is 8 km (5.0 mi) long northwest to southeast, 4 km (2.5 mi) wide, and has a surface area of 28.8 km^{2} (11.1 sq mi).

The harbour is a deep basin with an average water depth of 3.1 m (10 ft) at mean sea level. It is bordered by a shallow intertidal to subtidal zone, most extensive off its western and southern shores.

No significant rivers flow into the harbour. Its entrance from King George Sound – Ataturk Channel – is short and narrow. Through that entrance, which has a minimum sectional area of 3,470 m^{2} (37,400 sq ft), there is a shipping channel, maintained to a depth of 12.5 m (41 ft). Within the harbour, a turning basin adjacent to the port wharfs on the northeast shore has been dredged to 12 m (39 ft) deep.

== Ecology ==
Harbour panorama

The harbour is the location of a seagrass meadow of Posidonia. Water quality has been tested and monitored over time.
