= Cuthbert, Western Australia =

Locality in the City of Albany, Western Australia

Cuthbert
- Town
- Coordinates: 35°0′57″S 117°47′54″E
- Country: Australia
- State: Western Australia
- LGA: City of Albany
- Location: 415.6 km (258.2 mi) from Perth; 151.9 km (94.4 mi) from Kojonup; 10 km (6.2 mi) from Albany

Government
  - State electorate: Albany
  - Federal division: O'Connor

Area
  - Total: 6.9 km^{2} (2.7 sq mi)
- Elevation: 9 m (30 ft)

Population
  - Total: 157 (2021)
  - Density: 22.75/km^{2} (58.9/sq mi)
- Postcode: 6330

Cuthbert is a town and locality of the City of Albany in the Great Southern region of Western Australia. Cuthbert is about 8 km (5.0 mi) west of the Albany city center.

Cuthbert was originally established as a siding on the Great Southern Railway and called Eastwood at the time. In 1909 the decision was made to establish a town site at Eastwood but the name was already in use in three other Australian states and therefore deemed unsuitable. The alternative names of Karajinup and Atwell were considered but, eventually, Werillup was chosen and the townsite was gazetted in 1914. Werillup, meaning "place of swamps", was rejected as a name the following year and the town was officially renamed to Cuthbert in September 1916, after an early European settler.

== Demographics ==
As of the 2021 Australian census, 157 people resided in Cuthbert, up from 156 in the 2016 census. The median age of persons in Cuthbert was 48 years. There were fewer males than females, with 48.1% of the population male and 51.9% female. The average household size was 2.5 people per household.
