= Elleker, Western Australia =

Town in the City of Albany, Western Australia

Elleker
- Town
- Coordinates: 35°01′00″S 117°43′00″E
- Country: Australia
- State: Western Australia
- LGA: City of Albany
- Location: 16 km (9.9 mi) W of Albany
- Established: 1890s

Government
  - State electorate: Albany
  - Federal division: O'Connor

Area
  - Total: 43.8 km^{2} (16.9 sq mi)
- Elevation: 14 m (46 ft)

Population
  - Total: 356 (SAL 2021)
- Postcode: 6330

Elleker is a small town and locality of the City of Albany in the Great Southern region of Western Australia. It is located approximately about 16 kilometres (10 mi) west of the regional city of Albany. It is situated along the Lower Denmark Road; the main tourist route from Albany to Denmark.

== Railways ==
The town was planned by the Western Australian Land Company, who built the Great Southern Railway in 1886–1889. It was originally known as Lakeside, due to its proximity to Lake Powell, but did not develop initially.

The Government purchased the railway in 1896, redesigned the town and gazetted it as Lakeside in 1899. The town emerged as a railway junction between the Torbay line, later the Elleker to Nornalup railway line, which originally served timber sawmills in the area, and the Great Southern railway, and it was renamed Torbay Junction in 1908. In 1921, it was renamed Elleker on the recommendation of a former member of the Albany Road Board who lived in the area, after Ellerker in the East Riding of Yorkshire. The reasons for the omission of the first "r" are not known.

== Townsite ==
The townsite includes several houses, a general store, oval, town hall, railway siding as mentioned and a telephone booth.

Its close proximity to Mutton Bird Beach and the Elleker-Grasmere Road see the townsite experience tourism fluctuations over the summer months.

The townsite is noted for the presence of the house used as the Leonard family home in the Nine Network TV show Lockie Leonard (2007–2010), based on the book series by Tim Winton.
