= Chatham Island (Western Australia) =

Island in Western Australia

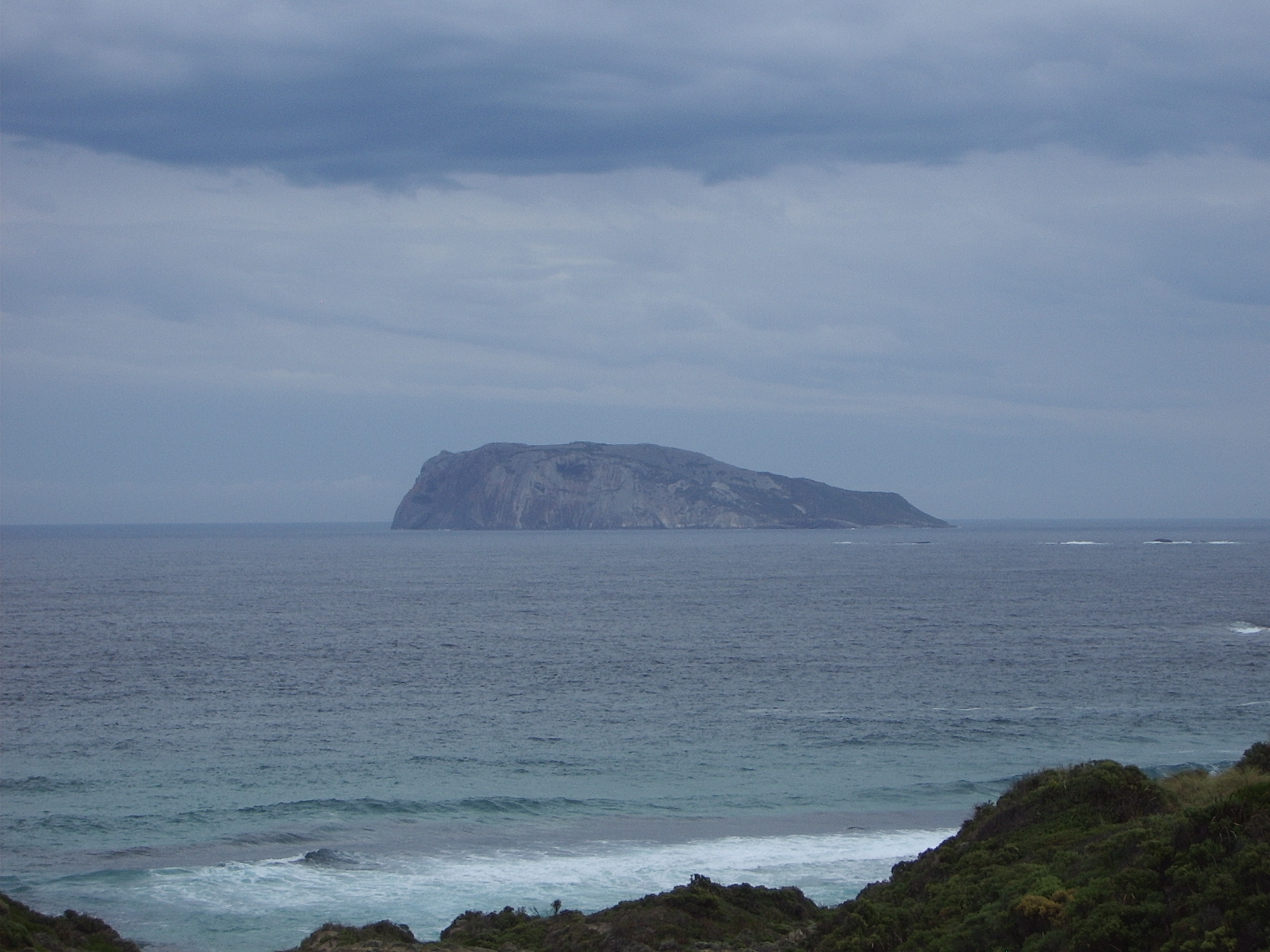
- Chatham Island from Long Point at D'Entrecasteaux National Park

- Chatham Island (Western Australia)

Geography
- Location: Indian Ocean
- Coordinates: 35°2′S 116°30′E
- Area: 0.99 km^{2} (0.38 sq mi)
- Length: 1.4 km (0.87 mi)
- Width: 0.93 km (0.578 mi)

Administration
- Australia
- State: Western Australia
- Region: Great Southern
- Shire: Shire of Manjimup

Demographics
- Population: 0

Chatham Island is located in the South Ward (Walpole) of Manjimup Shire in the Great Southern region of Western Australia. It is approximately 1.1 km (0.68 mi) offshore from D'Entrecasteaux National Park and 3 km (1.9 mi) offshore from Mandalay Beach. Declared a class 1A Nature reserve in 1973, the island has a total area of 106 hectares (260 acres).

Named as Cape Chatham by George Vancouver aboard HMS Discovery in 1791, the island was subsequently renamed as Chatham Island.
