= Torndirrup National Park =

National park in Western Australia

- IUCN category II (national park)
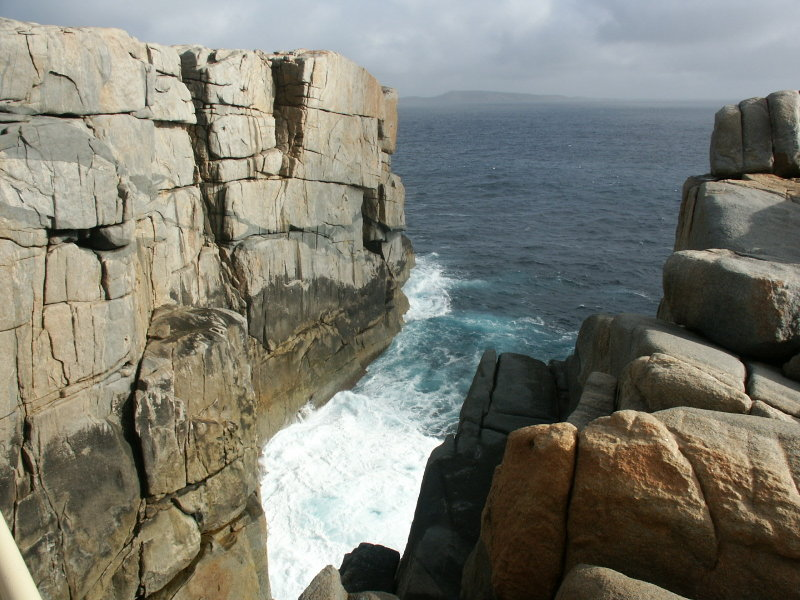
- The Gap

- Location within Western Australia
- Location: Western Australia
- Coordinates: 35°05′25″S 117°53′29″E
- Area: 39.36 km^{2} (15.20 sq mi)
- Established: 1918
- Governing body: Department of Parks and Wildlife
- Website: Official website

Torndirrup National Park is a national park in the Great Southern region of Western Australia, 400 kilometres (249 mi) southeast of Perth and via Frenchman Bay Road is 10 km (6.2 mi) south of Albany.

Torndirrup National Park has many impressive rock formations on the coast. These include the Gap, Natural Bridge and the Blowholes all shaped from the local granite. The park is along the coast on the west side of King George Sound; it consists of a range of cliffs, gullies, blowholes, beaches and promontories.

== History ==
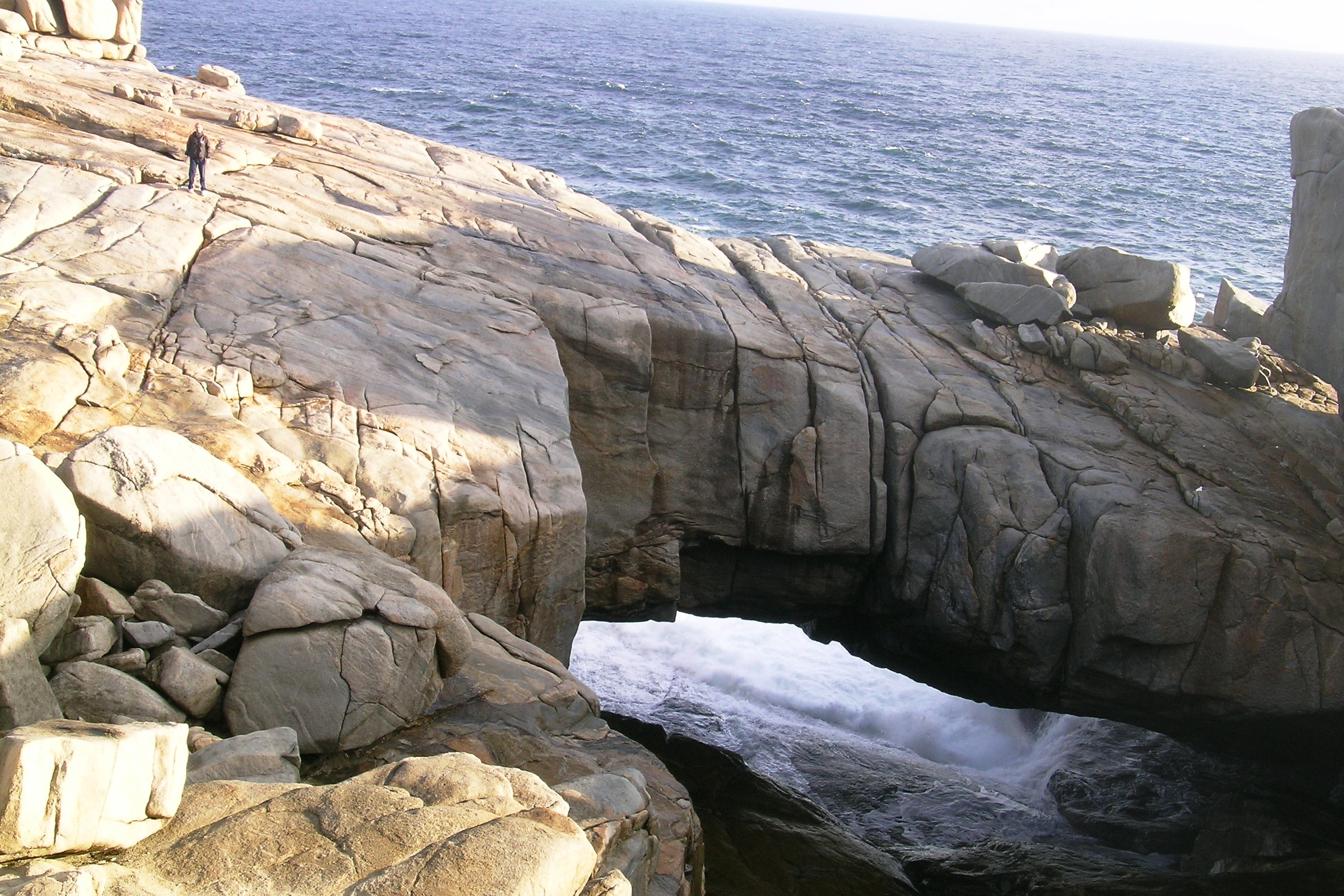
Natural Bridge

The area is composed of three major rock types, one of these being gneiss. The oldest of these was formed 1,300-1,600 million years ago. This rock type can be seen along the cliff walls of the Gap. The granites were formed later as the Australian Plate collided with the Antarctic Plate 1,160 million years ago as molten rock rose to the surface. These granites are visible in the tors atop Stony Hill.

The park was gazetted in 1918, one of the first in Western Australia. It was later named in 1969 taking the name of the Indigenous Australian clan that lived in the area. The first ranger was appointed in 1973. The park is the most often visited park in Western Australia, with approximately 250,000 visitors per annum.

A large bushfire burnt through 700 hectares (1,730 acres) of bushland in the area in 2010 and caused the closure of Frenchman Bay Road isolating tourists and residents of the area. In 2015 another fire burnt out 616 hectares (1,522 acres) of bushland between Stony Hill and the Blowholes including destroying important populations of the critically endangered Banksia verticillata.

== Flora and fauna ==
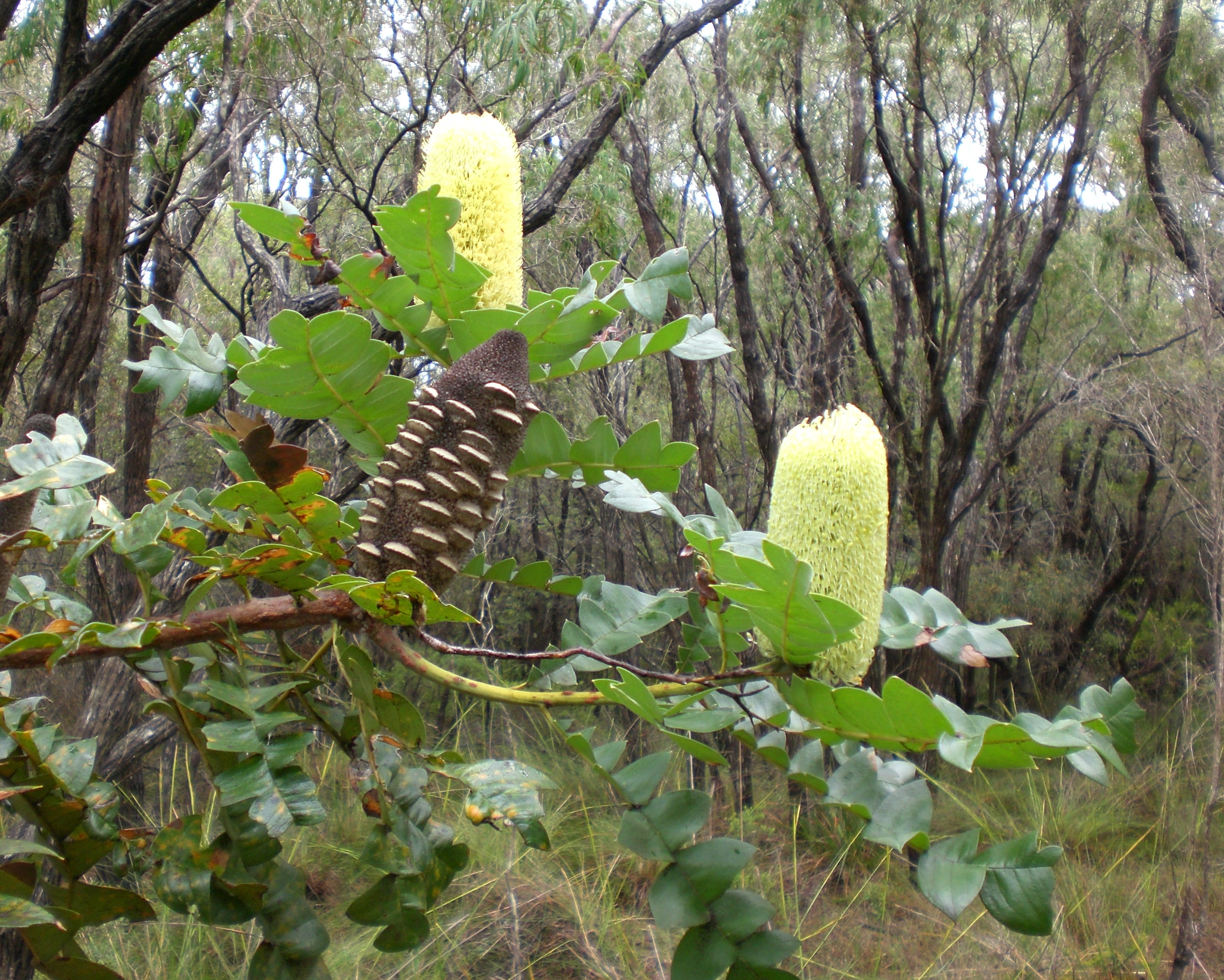
Banksia grandis at Torndirrup

A large array of floral species can be found within the park, including the woolly-bush, peppermint tree, swamp yate, various banksias and karri forest. Coastal plants such as native rosemary, banjine and thick leafed fanflower are found in the heath. The park is also home to the very rare Albany woolly-bush and the critically endangered blue tinsel lily of which only a single population exists.

Fauna such as kangaroos, bush rats, pygmy possums and short-nosed bandicoots are found within the park. Many reptile species are also to be found, including tiger snakes, bardick, Children's python and dugites. In 1876 the rare dibbler was found in the park. Birdlife includes honeyeaters, wattlebirds, button quail, western rosella and a variety of seabirds. Whales and seals can be seen from the cliffs of the park in the correct season.

The rare and ancient Main's assassin spider, currently listed as threatened, was found to inhabit the park during a survey conducted in 2008.

== Facilities ==
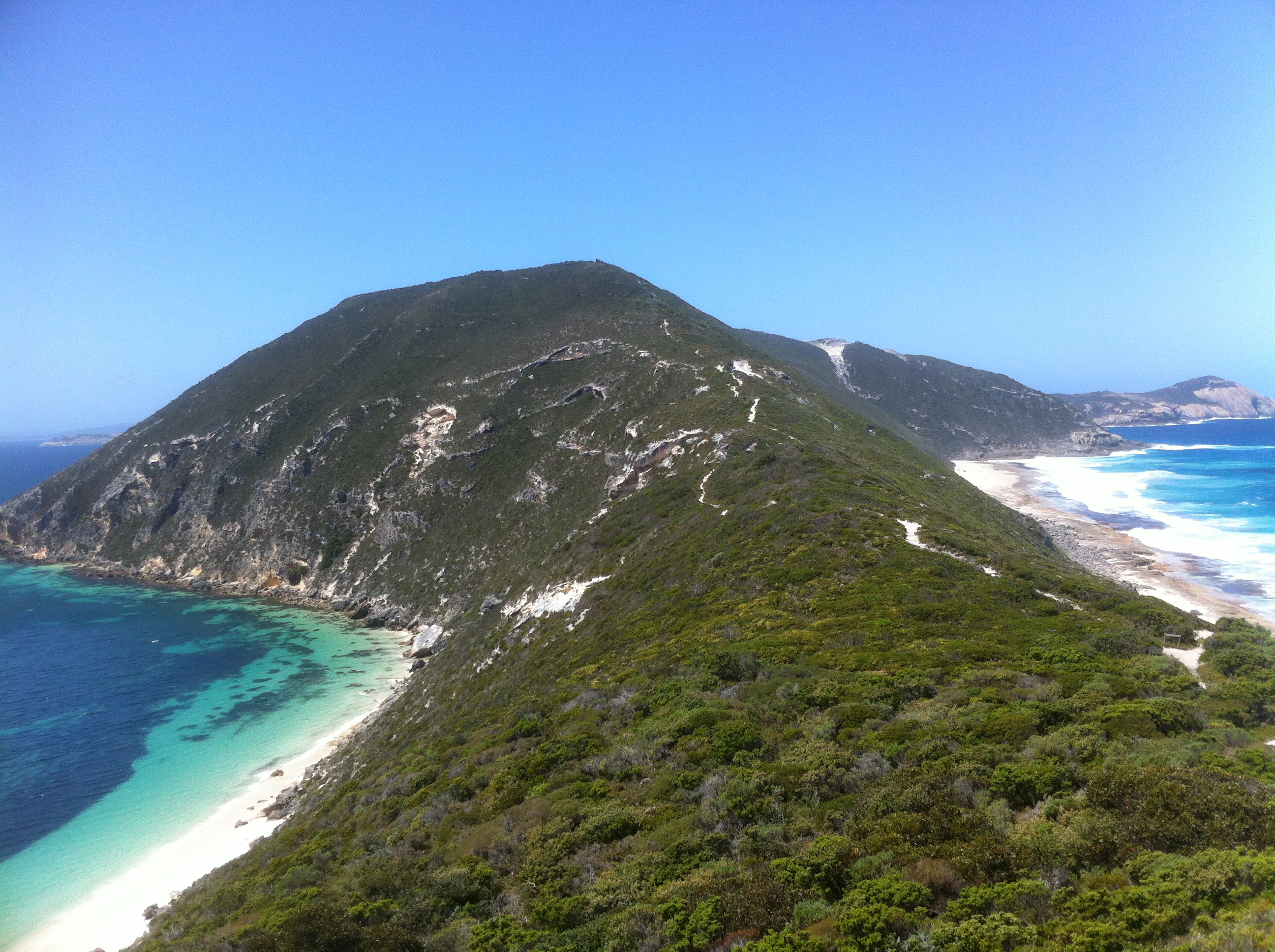
View along walking track out to Torndirrup Peninsula and Bald Head

There is an entry fee to access the park. Access to the park is via Frenchman Bay Road, which is sealed and well sign-posted. Access to most features is via sealed roads. No other facilities exist within the park but barbecues, tables, shops and toilets can be found nearby at Frenchman Bay. Entry fees are required to visit the Gap and Natural Bridge.

The park has numerous walks, mostly of a distance of less than 1,500 metres (4,921 ft), including the Jimmy Newhills walk and the Stony Hill Heritage Trail walk. The longest trail is the 10 km (6.2 mi) Bald Head Walk along Flinders peninsula finishing at Bald Head at the eastern edge of the park.

A A$6.1 million upgrade of facilities at the Gap and the Natural Bridge opened in 2016. The redevelopment included two universally accessible lookout structures, connecting paths, a picnic area, interpretive signage and a car park. A cantilevered grated see-through platform at the Gap rises almost 40 metres (131 ft) above the Southern Ocean (also known as Antarctic Ocean) and extends 10 m (33 ft) out from the cliff face, of which 4 m (13 ft) is directly above the ocean.

== See also ==
- Protected areas of Western Australia
