= South coast of Western Australia =

Coastline of Western Australia

The south coast of Western Australia comprises the Western Australian coastline from Cape Leeuwin to Eucla. This is a distance of approximately 1,600 kilometres (1,000 mi), fronting the Great Australian Bight and the Southern Ocean.

== Components ==
The Bureau of Meteorology in forecast districts break up the south coast into four sub-regions:

- Leeuwin coast (Cape Naturaliste to Walpole)
- Albany coast (Walpole to Bremer Bay)
- Esperance coast (Bremer Bay to Israelite Bay)
- Eucla coast (Israelite Bay to Eucla)

With other authorities and departments, the region is usually broken up into smaller regions, oriented to the Great Southern regional centre of Albany and, further east, Esperance.

However, some sources apply "south coast" from Windy Harbour to Mount Manypeaks as the delineating points for the coast.

== Rainbow Coast ==
The Rainbow Coast is a tourist region name for the coast as well. It is called the Rainbow Coast because of the fast-moving weather fronts that buffet the coast from the south. This, combined with the sun being close to the northern horizon in winter, creates regular displays of rainbows in the south. The main towns of the Rainbow Coast are Albany, Denmark and Walpole. The coast has dozens of national parks and nature reserves including:

- Mount Frankland National Park
- William Bay National Park
- West Cape Howe National Park, which is the southernmost point of Western Australia

Considerable numbers of government reports and environmental studies with "South Coast" in the titles are focused specifically on the coastline adjacent to the Great Southern region.

== Eucla Coast ==
The south east coast of Western Australia is designated as the "Eucla Coast" in Bureau of Meteorology forecasts.

The coastline was travelled and written up by Daisy Bates before the first world war.

== See also ==
- Coastal regions of Western Australia

Local features

- List of islands of Western Australia
- List of watercourses in Western Australia

Regional divisions

- Interim Biogeographic Regionalisation for Australia
- Ecoregions in Australia
- Regions of Western Australia
