= Albany Motorsports Park =

Motorsport track in Albany, Western Australia

- Location: Down Road W, Drome, Western Australia
- Coordinates: 34°55′59.1″S 117°44′52.6″E
- Owner: Great Southern Motorplex Group Incorporated; City of Albany
- Operator: Great Southern Motorplex Group Incorporated
- Broke ground: July 2022; 4 years ago
- Opened: 2 March 2024; 2 years ago
- Website: https://www.albanymotorsportpark.com.au/index.html

Full Circuit (2027 Planned)
- Length: 3.25 km (2.02 mi)
- Turns: 11

North Circuit (2025-present)
- Length: 1.09 km (0.68 mi)
- Turns: 5

South Circuit (2027 Planned)
- Turns: 9

Albany Motorsports Park is a 3.25 km (2.02 mi) motorsport circuit located in Drome, approximately 375 km (233 mi) south of Perth in Western Australia. It is currently being built by Great Southern Motorplex Group Incorporated.

== History ==
The greater Albany area has played host to motor racing since at least the mid-1930s with the first known motor race in the area being the 1936 Albany Tourist Trophy (or more famously known as the Albany Around the Houses). The event was a 25 lap race held on a 4 km course through the city center with approximately 10,000 people attending the first race. This race was organised with the newly founded WA Sporting Car Club. This race has been re enacted as a speed event on a shortened course every year since 1991 with 2020 being excepted because of the COVID-19 pandemic.

In 1957, Mt Clarence hosted the Australian Hill Climb Championship for the first time in Western Australia. As of 2026, the city of Albany still hosts a re-enactment event the Saturday before the Albany Classic Motor Event and is a part of Western Australia's tarmac rally series, Tarmac Events.

Toward Albany's regional Airport, Albany Regional Airport, there is the Albany City Kart Club that has existed in that location in some form since at least 1961 but organisational since 1996. The land has previously hosted a dirt speedway that has since moved roughly 2.5 km south, two dirt circuits, and a paved circuit of 750 m in length. Since 1996, the kart track has had a number of upgrades, including a 2014 government-funded track extension.

In 2022, the Great Southern Motorplex Group Inc. was set up after the City of Albany purchased 192 ha of nearly empty land in Drome, nearly 16 km away from the city center. This was followed up by the local city announcing that a 3.25 km circuit would be built on the site, including a 2.4 km Motocross circuit, a drift training area, 4WD area, drag racing strip, and others. After backlash from residents near the circuit, it was decided that only the 3.25 km main circuit and 2.4 km motocross circuit would be built.

== Track features ==
As of 2026, only the North Circuit has been constructed, meaning it is still mostly unknown what the full circuit would be like.
