= Kawasaki e-1 =

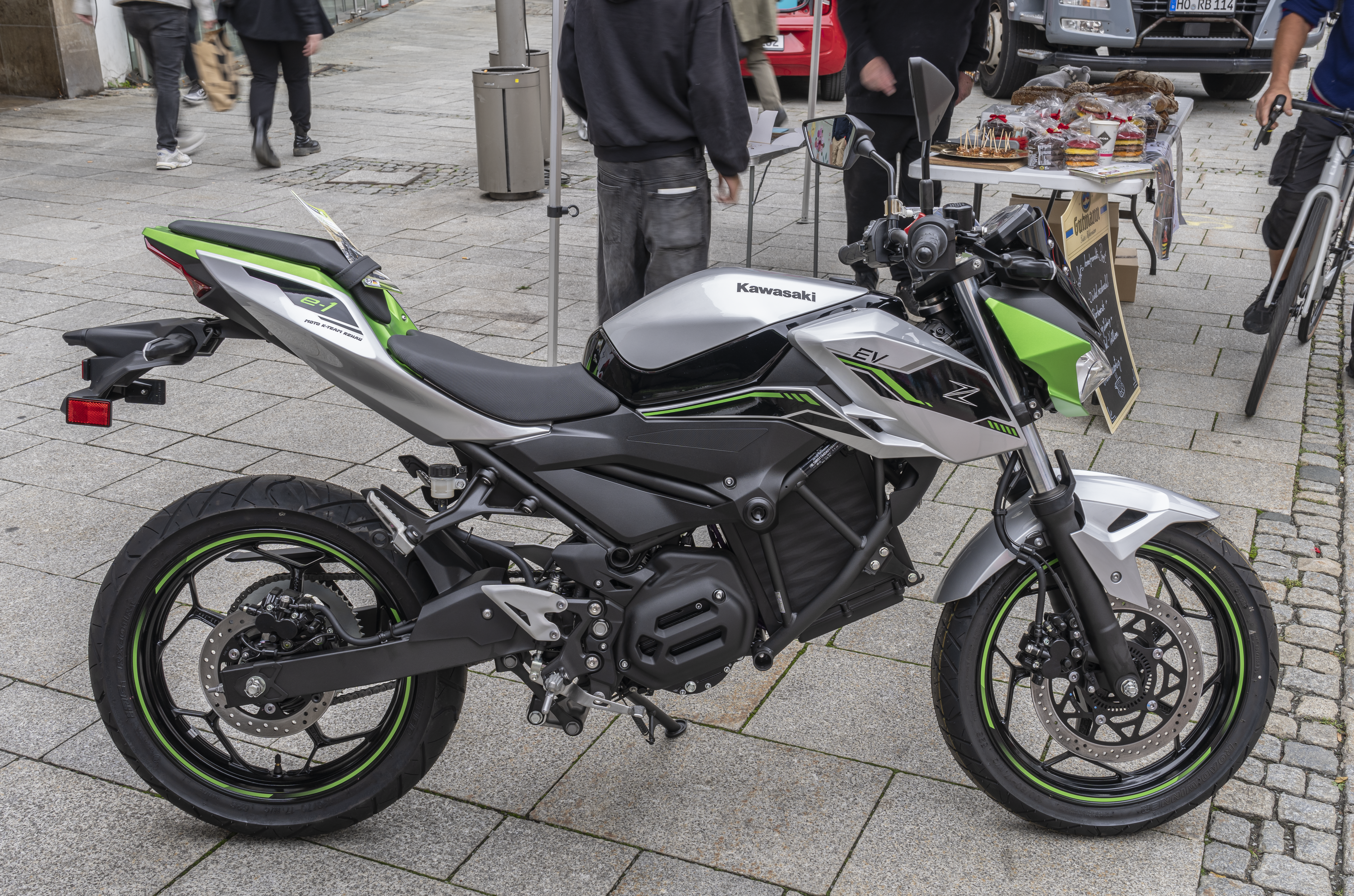
- Kawasaki Z e-1
- Manufacturer: Kawasaki Motors
- Parent company: Kawasaki Heavy Industries
- Production: 2023 (to commence)
- Class: Electric motorcycle
- Power: 9 kW (12 hp)
- Transmission: 1-speed, chain drive
- Tires: F: 100/80R-17; R: 130/70R-17
- Wheelbase: 53.9 in (1,370 mm)
- Dimensions: W: 690–730 mm (27–29 in)
- Weight: 298–308 lb (135–140 kg) (dry)

The Kawasaki e-1 is an electric motorcycle produced by Kawasaki, which markets it in two variants: a naked Z e-1 and a Ninja e-1 sport bike with fairing.

== History ==
Kawasaki debuted its "Endeavor" prototype electric motorcycle at EICMA 2019. The prototype, shown at EICMA as the "EV Project", had a claimed peak and continuous output of 20 and 10 kW (27 and 13 hp), with an estimated range of 100 km (62 mi); it is approximately the same size and weight as the Ninja 650, respectively, with a curb weight of 220 kg (485 lb). The prototype also was equipped with a four-speed gearbox, chain drive, and regenerative braking. Patent filings indicate the prototype had been under development since 2010.

The two e-1 bikes are the first production electric motorcycles from the company. Kawasaki demonstrated prototype e-1 bikes in August 2022 at the Suzuka 8 Hours race; the official announcement was made at EICMA that November. The two e-1 bikes share a common chassis and traction motor. Styling is identical to the gasoline-engined bikes, the Z400 and Ninja 400. Brakes and wheels are borrowed from the earlier Z300 and Ninja 300.

== Design ==
=== Powertrain and battery ===
Because the e-1 uses a single-speed reduction gear and the traction motor occupies the same space as the transmission, there is no clutch and gear lever; however, the rear brake is operated by a foot lever, rather than a left-hand lever as typical for scooters. Rated output is 9 kW (12 hp), designed to conform with the requirements of the Class A1 driving licence in European markets.

There are two slots for removable batteries, each with a capacity of 1.5 kW-hr. Each lithium-ion battery weighs approximately 26.5 lb (12.0 kg). Kawasaki is a member of the Swappable Battery Consortium for Electric Motorcycles, established with Honda, Suzuki, and Yamaha in April 2019 to standardize battery size and format and facilitate battery swapping. The Consortium established Gachaco, Inc. with ENEOS in April 2022, which launched a battery sharing/swapping service in Japan that fall using the Honda Mobile Power Pack e: (MPP). MPP was introduced in 2017 for the Honda PCX Electric.
