= Wanneroo Raceway =

Motorsport track in Perth, Western Australia

MotorMall Wanneroo Raceway
- Long Circuit (1969–present)
- Location: Wattle Avenue, Neerabup, Western Australia
- Coordinates: 31°39′55.08″S 115°47′28.68″E
- Capacity: 50,000
- FIA Grade: 3
- Owner: WA Sporting Car Club
- Operator: WA Sporting Car Club
- Broke ground: July 1968; 58 years ago
- Opened: 2 March 1969; 57 years ago
- Former names: CARCO.com.au Raceway (2022-2025); Wanneroo Raceway (2020–2022); Barbagallo Raceway (1992–2020); Wanneroo Park (1969–1992)
- Major events: Current: Supercars Championship; Perth Super 440 (1973, 1978–2009, 2011–2019, 2022–present); Australian Improved Production Nationals (2010, 2017, 2026); Former: GT World Challenge Australia (1982, 2016–2017, 2019, 2023); Stadium Super Trucks (2017–2018); F4 Australia (2017); Australian Grand Prix (1979); Six Hour Le Mans (1969–1972)
- Website: https://wannerooraceway.com.au

Long Circuit (1969–present)
- Length: 2.411 km (1.498 mi)
- Turns: 7
- Race lap record: 0:50.5769 ( (Australia) Gary West, Lola T87/50, 2007, F3000)

Bike Circuit (2019–present)
- Length: 2.413 km (1.499 mi)
- Turns: 9
- Race lap record: 0:55.909 ( (Australia) Cameron Stronach, Yamaha YZF-R1, 2022, SBK)

Short Circuit (1992–2018)
- Length: 1.760 km (1.094 mi)
- Turns: 8

Wanneroo Raceway, currently known as MotorMall Wanneroo Raceway for naming rights reasons, is a 2.411 km (1.498 mi) motorsport circuit located in Neerabup, approximately 50 km (31 mi) north of Perth in Western Australia. It was built by the WA Sporting Car Club.

The circuit was originally known as Wanneroo Park and the first race meet took place in March 1969. Initially the major race per year was a 6-hour Le Mans style race for sedans and sports cars known as the Six Hour Le Mans. However, as interest dulled in that event, production car racing took over as the major race type. In 1979, the Australian Grand Prix was held for the first and so far only time at Wanneroo Raceway which coincided with the opening of the new pits and paddock area to the west of the circuit. The Grand Prix was won by South Australian Johnnie Walker driving a Lola T332 Formula 5000. Walker was the last driver to win the AGP driving a Formula 5000.

In 1992, it was decided that a short circuit would be constructed by linking Turn 5 on the current circuit to the back straight forming a new 1.760 km (1.094 mi) circuit. This extension was funded by prominent West Australian motorsport identity Alf Barbagallo and hence the circuit name was changed to Barbagallo Raceway. The short circuit allowed for an increase in the types of racing including the inclusion of truck racing and also allowed events to be run at night. The short circuit remained until 2018 when its license was not renewed due to track changes where the short circuit re-joins the main track.

The circuit was renamed Wanneroo Raceway in 2020, however its name was changed as CARCO.com.au Raceway from August 2022 to November 2025.

In December 2025, MotorMall was announced as the new naming rights sponsor with the name changing to MotorMall Wanneroo Raceway.

== Events ==
Formula One ace Mark Webber drove a demonstration run at the circuit on 28 November 2010.

The track holds a number of major race meets each year, with the biggest being a round of the Supercars Championship called the Perth Super 440. This is one of the biggest sporting events in Western Australia each year with over 50,000 people attending the 3-day event.

The circuit offers patrons drift racing as an occasional spectacle. Some criticism has also come from opponents of drifting, due to damage caused to the track surface, especially heading into Cat Corner at the end of the main straight, where entries of over 100 km/h (62 mph) are not uncommon.

The circuit hosted the inaugural Australian Festival of Speed in 2010. Formula One team Red Bull Racing and driver Mark Webber attended for a demonstration. The festival never returned to the circuit, having bankrupted the owners.

The circuit also hosts a number of motorcycle racing and training events, including the WA State Championships for Superbikes, Supersport and Sidecars – along with a number of support classes.

== Upgrades ==
The circuit was completely resurfaced in 2004 and this saw almost all lap records broken in the first few months of 2004. Due to the sandy nature of the area the circuit slowly became more and more abrasive over time and was considered one of the toughest on tyres in the country.

Due to the removal of the circuit from the V8 Supercar calendar for 2010 season, the state government considered upgrading the track to improve the quality of the track and its facilities.

Many options were considered, which included extending the track to the north which would roughly double the length of the circuit, there were also alternative extension plans which were smaller. The widening of the track was also addressed, which would be needed to extend the track for safety regulations. The plan of the track extension was expensive if all aspects of the plan were considered, this would see this major upgrade of the circuit be postponed until the necessary upgrades are completed.

On 18 July 2011, the track's control tower was torn down, beginning the first stage of upgrades that saw the track widened, and a new pit facility built in the centre of the circuit, with connecting bridge. Improved lighting and safety barriers, as well as upgrades to facilities and buildings within the circuit formed part of the project.

Following a number of deaths at the circuit in motorcycle events, motorcycle racing was banned from Wanneroo Raceway in November 2016 until a number of safety upgrades could be implemented. In June 2016 the WA government released the "Wanneroo Safety Enhancement Options Identification Assessment", also known as the Hall Report, recommending changes to the circuit to allow motorbike racing to return. These upgrades included the addition of a motorcycle-only chicane at turn 3, a barrier wall through the infield area between turns 4 and the back straight and some other minor improvements, and were added to the circuit in January 2017. Some of these changes ultimately lead to the removal of the track license for the short circuit for race events, although it is still used for limited club events and drifting.

The circuit was resurfaced again in early 2019, and was relicensed by Motorcycling Australia in March 2019, allowing racing to return.

== Touring Car round winners ==
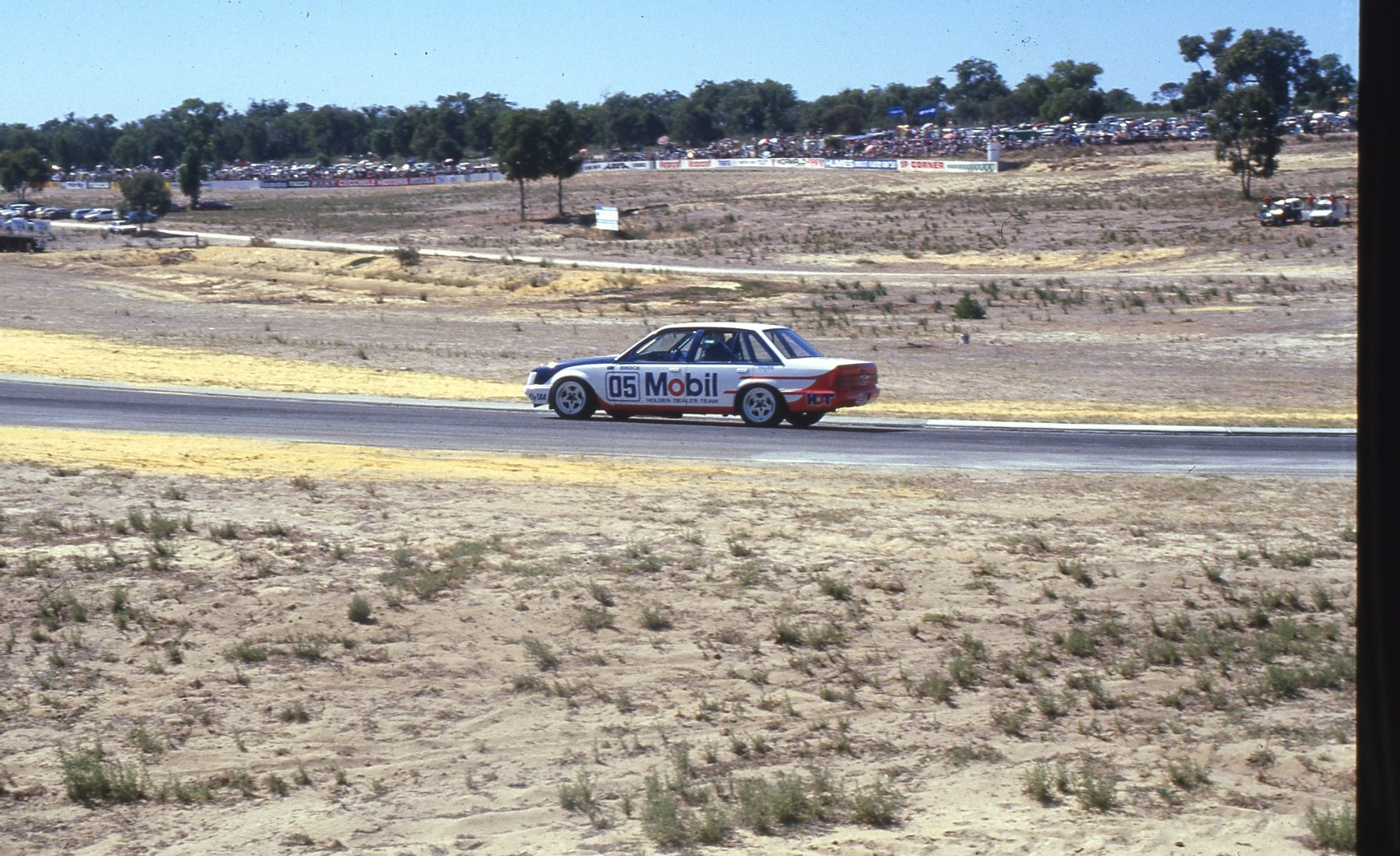
Peter Brock racing at Wanneroo Park in 1985

Wanneroo Raceway has held rounds of the Australian Touring Car Championship since 1973. The circuit was left off the calendar from 1974 to 1977, 2010 and in 2020 to 2021 because of Covid-19

Craig Lowndes has won the most ATCC / V8 Supercars rounds at the circuit with six wins. The most successful touring car team at Wanneroo is the Dick Johnson Racing with seven wins.

The first ATCC race held at the circuit in 1973 was won by Allan Moffat driving a Ford XY Falcon GTHO Phase III for the Ford Works Team.

== Event List ==
Current

- March: OutPace Motorshow
- August: Supercars Championship Perth Super 440, SuperUtes Series, Australian National Trans-Am Series
- September: Australian HQ Nationals
- October: Australian Improved Production Nationals
- November: Night Masters Cup

Former

- Aussie Racing Cars (2014, 2017, 2024–2025)
- Australian 2.0 Litre Touring Car Championship (1993)
- Australian Drivers' Championship (1979, 1982, 1984–1986)
- Australian Formula Ford Championship (1992, 1994, 1996–2007)
- Australian Grand Prix (1979)
- Australian GT Production Car Championship (2000)
- Australian Mini Challenge (2008–2009)
- Australian Sports Car Championship (1970–1973, 1982)
- Australian Sports Sedan Championship (1976–1981, 1999)
- Australian Superbike Championship (1990–2001, 2004–2006, 2011–2012, 2015–2016)
- Formula 4 Australian Championship (2017)
- GT World Challenge Australia (1982, 2016–2017, 2019, 2023)
- Porsche Carrera Cup Australia Championship (2004–2005, 2008, 2011–2012)
- Six Hour Le Mans (1969–1972)
- Stadium Super Trucks (2017–2018)
- Touring Car Masters (2005, 2007, 2011, 2013, 2024)
- V8 Ute Racing Series (2008, 2011–2015)

== Lap records ==
On 14 March 2026, Todd Hazelwood broke the unofficial lap record by nearly 2 seconds with a lap of 0:48.7563 during the inaugural Outpace Motorshow, driving Tanuki Racing's Nissan S13 time attack car.

As of August 2026, the fastest official race lap records at Wanneroo Raceway are listed as:

Class	Driver	Vehicle	Time	Date
Long Circuit (1969–present): 2.411 km (1.498 mi)
F3000	(Australia) Gary West	Lola T87/50	0:50.5769	25 March 2007
F1000	(Australia) Nick Percat	Stohr F1000	0:53.0792	13 July 2019
Sports Sedan	(Australia) Tony Ricciardello	Alfa Romeo GTV-Chevrolet	0:53.1680	3 March 2019
Formula Mondial	(Australia) John Bowe	Ralt RT4	0:53.44	25 August 1984
Australian GT	(Australia) Peter Major	Lamborghini Gallardo R-EX	0:53.7056	4 May 2019
Supercars	(Australia) James Courtney	Holden Commodore ZB	0:53.7293	3 May 2019
GT3	(Germany) Christopher Mies	Audi R8 LMS Evo	0:53.8065	30 April 2023
Super2	(Australia) Zane Goddard	Nissan Altima	0:54.3949	3 May 2019
Radical Cup	(Australia) Aaron Love	Radical SR3 RS	0:54.6375	13 July 2019
F5000	(Australia) John Wright (Note: Both riders took the same lap time independently in the same race.) (Australia) Johnnie Walker	Lola T400; Lola T332	0:54.92	11 March 1979
Superbikes	(Australia) Daniel Falzon	Yamaha YZF-R1	0:55.446	5 June 2016
Super3	(Australia) Brad Vaughan	Ford FG Falcon	0:56.7392	30 April 2022
Porsche Carrera Cup	(New Zealand) Steven Richards	Porsche 911 (997) GT3 Cup	0:56.9816	1 May 2011
Supersport	(Australia) Sam Clarke	Kawasaki Ninja ZX-6R	0:57.184	5 June 2016
Trans-Am Australia	(Australia) Lachlan Evennett	Chevrolet Camaro Trans-Am	0:57.5792	2 August 2026
Group 3A	(Australia) Craig Lowndes	Holden Commodore VR	0:57.995	26 May 1996
250cc Grand Prix	(Australia) Rip Crocker	Yamaha TZR250	0:58.050	8 October 1995
Formula 4	(Australia) Nick Rowe	Mygale M14-F4	0:58.4291	6 May 2017
GT4	(Australia) Justin McMillian	KTM X-Bow GT4	0:58.727	4 May 2019
Street Car Racing	(Australia) Andrew Stevens	Nissan 180SX	0:58.9157	24 July 2016
Group A	(Australia) John Bowe	Ford Sierra RS500 Cosworth	0:59.040	7 June 1992
Sidecar	(United Kingdom) Steve Abbott (United Kingdom) Jamie Biggs	LCR-Suzuki GSX-R1000	0:59.4480	29 May 2005
Formula Ford	(Australia) Ashley Walsh	Spectrum 011b	0:59.5717	24 March 2007
Formula Ford Kent	(Australia) James Small	Van Diemen 011b	0:59.7669	13 June 2004
Touring Car Masters	(Australia) Adam Garwood	Holden Commodore VB	1:00.0355	19 May 2024
Group 3J Improved Production Cars	(Australia) Matt Cherry	Holden Monaro CV8	1:00.2690	1 May 2021
125cc Grand Prix	(Australia) Josh Brookes	Honda RS125R	1:00.7983	8 October 2000
Formula Ford Silver	(Australia) Ray Stubber	Royale RP31M	1:02.2195	20 May 2007
Group C (Australia)	(Canada) Allan Moffat	Mazda RX-7	1:02.37	1 April 1984
Group Nc	(Australia) Paul Stubber	Chevrolet Camaro	1:02.7990	29 April 2023
Aussie Racing Cars	(Australia) Joel Heinrich	Ford Mustang-Yamaha	1:02.9235	6 June 2025
Clubman Sports	(Australia) Terry Smith	Hooper	1:03.8160	8 April 2006
Group 3E Series Production	(Australia) Brent Peters	BMW M3 (E90)	1:03.6330	28 July 2025
SuperUtes Series	(Australia) David Sieders	Mazda BT-50 (TF)	1:04.3009	2 August 2026
Saloon Cars	(Australia) Grant Johnson	Holden Commodore VT	1:05.1876	18 August 2019
Mini Challenge	(Australia) Leanne Tander	Mini Cooper R56 JCW	1:05.6260	11 May 2008
Supersport 300	(Australia) Sam Condon	Kawasaki Ninja 300	1:06.263	5 June 2016
V8 Ute Racing Series	(Australia) Grant Johnson	Ford FG Falcon Ute	1:06.4669	1 May 2015
Group Nb	(Australia) Graeme Woolhouse	Ford Mustang	1:06.7724	4 May 2019
Group Sc	(Australia) Harvey Leys	Porsche 911 Carrera	1:07.1633	26 July 2009
Formula Vee 1600	(Australia) Ryan Simpson	Jacer F2K6 Volkswagen	1:07.9889	14 October 2006
Formula Vee 1200	(Australia) Jez Hammond	Spook Mk 1 Volkswagen	1:09.6141	9 August 2004
Group Sb	(Australia) Ted Jordan	Porsche 356C	1:11.8089	18 April 2004
HQ Holden	(Australia) Tony James	HQ Holden	1:14.1755	11 July 2004
Group Sa	(Australia) John Rowe	Austin-Healey 3000 MkI	1:14.9372	6 May 2007
Group Na	(Australia) Terry Smith	Ford Zephyr	1:20.7941	11 July 2004
Bike Circuit (2019–present): 2.413 km (1.499 mi)
Superbikes	(Australia) Cameron Stronach	Yamaha YZF-R1	0:55.909	24 April 2022
Supersport	(Republic of Ireland) Tommy King	Kawasaki Ninja ZX-6R	0:58.285	29 November 2020
Supersport 300	(Australia) Jordan White	Kawasaki Ninja 400	1:06.3250	24 April 2022
150cc Junior 4T	(Australia) Lenny Cowley	Yamaha YZF-R15	1:17.7480	3 April 2022

== Oral history ==
- John Hurney
- Patsie McCrakan
