= Down Road Nature Reserve =

Nature reserve in Western Australia

- IUCN category Ia (strict nature reserve)
- Location within Western Australia
- Location: Western Australia
- Nearest city: Drome
- Coordinates: 34°57′S 117°45′E
- Area: 777 ha (1,920 acres)
- Established: 1932
- Governing body: Department of Parks and Wildlife

Down Road Nature Reserve is a protected area of Western Australia in the south-western part of the state. It is located approximately 14 km (8.7 mi) northwest of Albany. The nature reserve was gazetted on 7 October 1932, has a size of 7.77 square kilometres (3.00 mi^{2}), and is located within the Jarrah Forest bioregion.

== Geography ==
The protected area is near the village of Drome. There are a few unpaved paths through the area. A small river also flows through the area. Marbellup Flats and Seven Mile Creek wetlands extend into the sanctuary.

== Flora and fauna ==
Beaufortia sparsa grow in the nature reserve. The forest in the sanctuary is a mixed forest of jarrah and marri trees.
