= Albany Speed Classic =

Motor racing in Western Australia

Albany Speed Classic were motor racing events conducted in Albany, Western Australia.

Known as "round the houses" events, the races were conducted by the West Australian Sporting Car Club.

Initial events between 1936 and 1940 gained a lot of press coverage and publicity.

The events gained notoriety over participants the inclusion of motor cycles and car hill climbing contests. The events fell off during the Second World War but were revived soon after.

A similarly named set of events started in the same era in relation to cycling around Albany.
