= Kawasaki Z400 =

Motorcycle

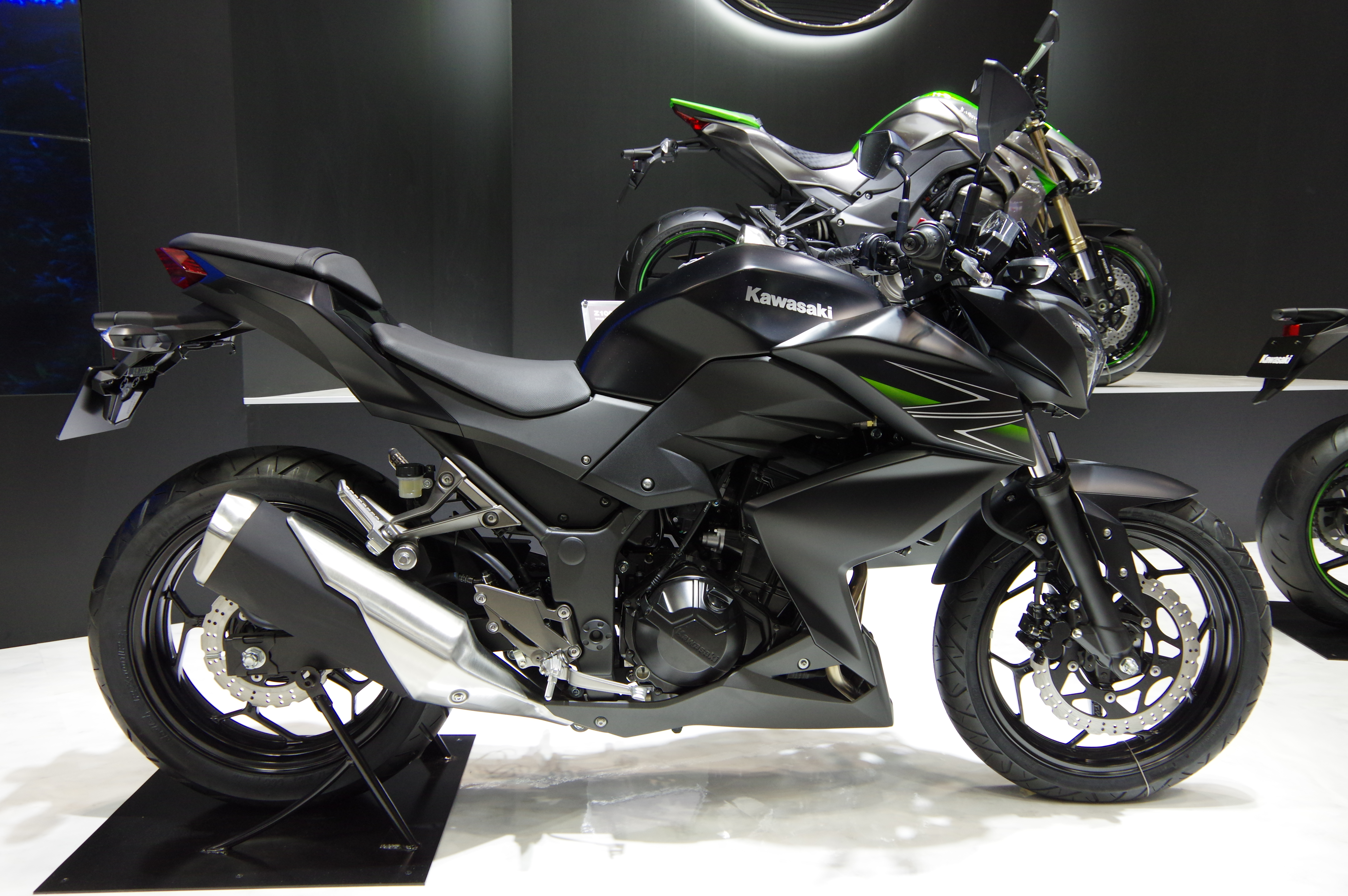
- Manufacturer: Kawasaki Motors
- Parent company: Kawasaki Heavy Industries
- Production: 2019–present
- Assembly: Rayong, Thailand; Manaus, Brazil
- Predecessor: Kawasaki Z300
- Class: Standard
- Engine: 399 cc (24.3 cu in) liquid-cooled 4-stroke 8-valve DOHC parallel-twin
- Bore / stroke: 70.0 mm × 51.8 mm (2.8 in × 2.0 in)
- Compression ratio: 11.5:1
- Transmission: 6-speed constant-mesh, chain final drive
- Frame type: Steel diamond with truss structure
- Suspension: Front: 41 mm (1.6 in) non-adjustable telescopic fork; Rear: Steel swingarm with gas-charged monoshock and 5-way adjustable spring preload
- Brakes: Front: Dual-piston caliper with single 310 mm (12.2 in) disc; Rear: Dual-piston caliper with single 220 mm (8.7 in) disc
- Tires: Front: 110/70–17; Rear: 150/60–17
- Seat height: 785 mm (30.9 in)
- Related: Kawasaki Ninja 400; Kawasaki Z250

The Kawasaki Z400 is a 399 cc Z series standard motorcycle introduced by Kawasaki as a successor to the Z300. It was unveiled at the 2018 EICMA in Milan, Italy. It is powered by a 399 cc (24.3 cu in) liquid-cooled parallel-twin engine derived from the Ninja 400 sport bike.

== History ==
=== 2022 update ===
The engine was made Euro 5 compliant.

The Z400 was released at a price of ฿205,700 (US$6,432.15) in Thailand. In Germany, the Z400 was released at €6,445 (US$7,622.5).

=== Electric variant ===
In November 2022, Kawasaki announced it would produce a naked Z sport bike with an electric drivetrain. Regulatory documents filed with the Australian government in 2023 show the bike will be marketed as the Z e-1, using the same basic chassis as the Z400.
