= Drome, Western Australia =

Locality in the City of Albany, Western Australia

Drome Western Australia
- Coordinates: 34°57′26″S 117°48′39″E
- Population: 52 (2021)
  - Density: 1.046/km^{2} (2.710/sq mi)
- Postcode(s): 6330
- Elevation: 72 m (236 ft)
- Area: 49.7 km^{2} (19.2 sq mi)
- Location: 403.2 km (251 mi) SE of Perth; 139.4 km (87 mi) SE of Kojonup; 14.7 km (9 mi) SE of Albany
- LGA(s): City of Albany
- State electorate(s): Albany
- Federal division(s): O'Connor

Drome is a locality in the Great Southern Region of Western Australia. Albany Airport is located in the south-east of Drome, as is the Down Road Nature Reserve. It is located 14.7 km (9.1 mi) from Albany on the Albany Highway and it is within the City of Albany local government area. The site is in the traditional settlement area of the Menang Aboriginal tribe. At the 2021 census, Drome recorded a population of 52.

== Geography ==
Drome is bounded by Marbelup in the west and south, Willyung in the east, and Redmond and Green Valley in the north. It is around 15 km (9 mi) to the port of Albany and the nearest coast. Drome is also bounded by the Down Road Nature Reserve in the southwest, and Albany Regional Airport in the south by 2.5 km (1.6 mi).

== Demographics ==
As of the 2021 Australian census, 52 people resided in Drome, up from 51 in the 2016 census. The median age of persons in Drome was 36 years. There were fewer males than females, with 46% of the population male and 54% female. The average household size was 2.9 people per household.
