= Kawasaki Ninja 250R =

Sport bike manufactured by Kawasaki

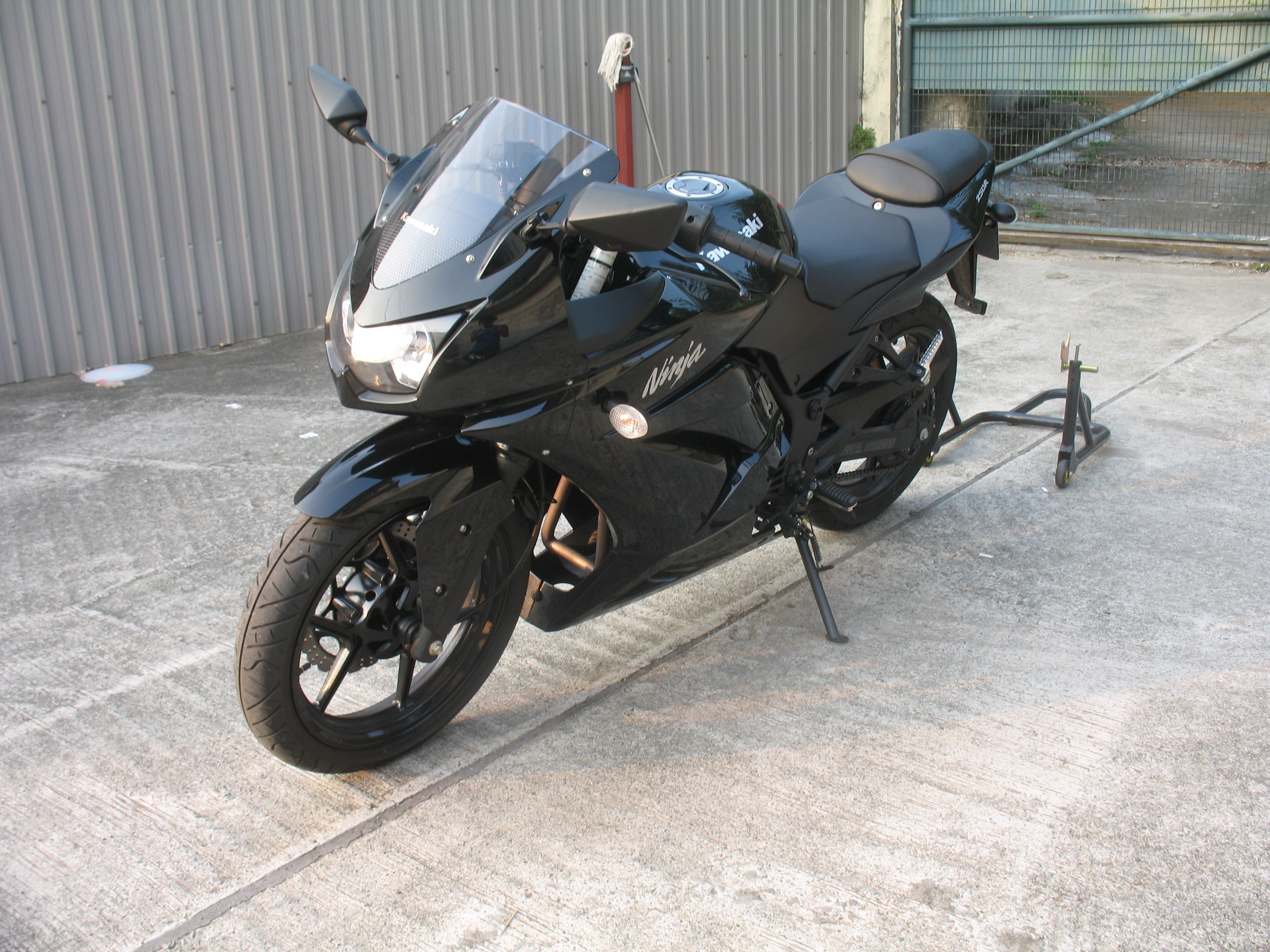
- Manufacturer: Kawasaki Motors
- Parent company: Kawasaki Heavy Industries
- Production: 1986–Current
- Class: Sport bike
- Related: Kawasaki Ninja 300; Kawasaki Ninja 400

The Kawasaki Ninja 250R (codenamed EX250; previous generations had market-specific names) is a motorcycle in the Ninja sport bike series from the Japanese manufacturer Kawasaki originally introduced in 1986. As the marque's entry-level sport bike, the motorcycle has undergone few changes throughout its quarter-century lifetime, having received only three substantial redesigns. In some markets, the Ninja 250R has been succeeded by the Ninja 300.

== Nomenclature ==
Since 2008, the bike has been marketed as the Ninja 250R in all markets. It is also referred to by its platform designation, EX250, to which a generational suffix is attached. In the United States, previous models (EX250-E/F/G/H) were already being marketed as members of the Ninja family of sport bikes, while outside of the U.S. the bike was known variously as the ZZR-250, ZX-250, or as the GPX-250R. One of the earliest models, the EX250-C, was given the name GPz-250 (the lower case z representing the air-cooled engine) and was a variant of the GPz-305.

== Model history ==
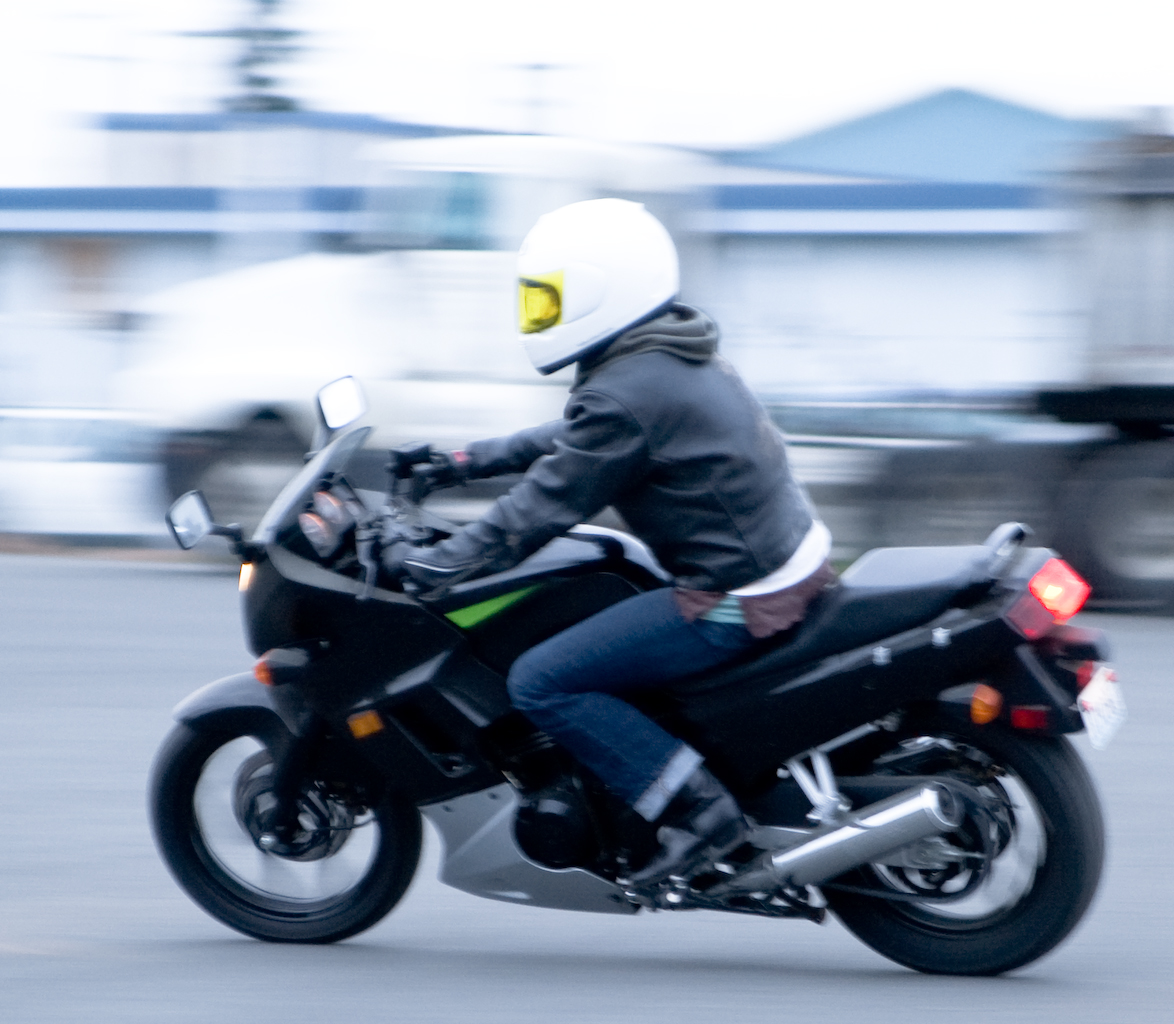
The Ninja 250R is popular in motorcycle training

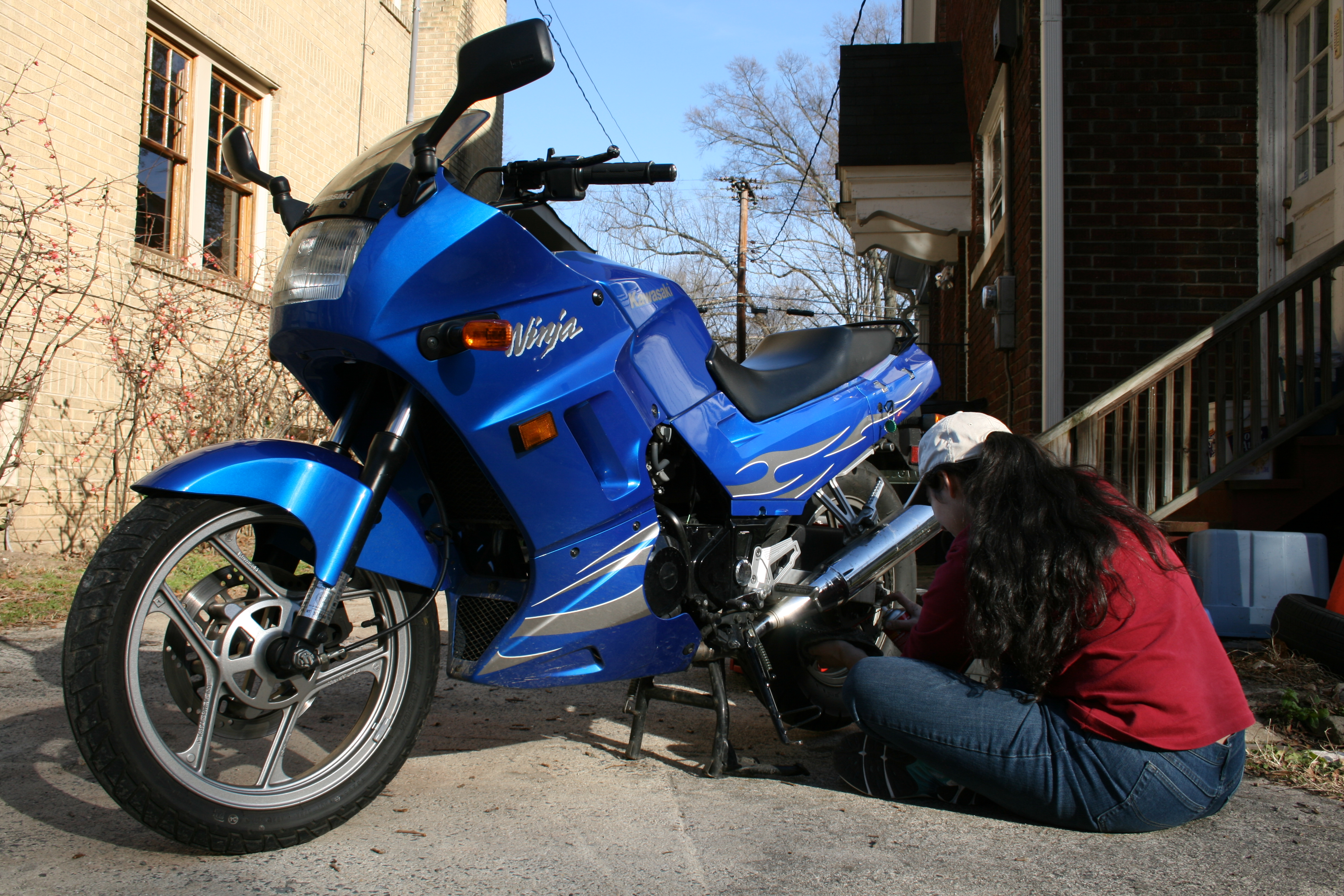
Cleaning the chain on a Ninja 250R

The Ninja 250R's particular ergonomics, chassis design, and engine placement have resulted in a motorcycle that straddles the standard and sport classes. The Ninja's riding posture also falls between standard and sport.

=== 1983–1985 (EX250-C) ===
The first generation was produced between 1983 and 1985, and known by the production number EX250-C. It was sold as the GPz-250. Sold in its home market of Japan and in Australia, this earliest, Toothed belt version was first produced in 1983, and shares no commonality with later generations, but is a variant of the z-250-Scorpion and the GPz-305 range. The bike has 32 mm fork tubes.

=== 1986–1987 (EX250-E) ===
Produced between 1986 and 1987 was the EX250-E. This model was sold as the Ninja 250R in Canada and the U.S. between 1986 and 1987. It was known as the GPZ-250R elsewhere. When originally introduced, it was more costly than the Honda Rebel, and reviewers complained that while the 14,000 rpm redline was nice, the engine was slow to rev.

EX-250-E Specifications
Engine
| Type | Four-stroke Inline twin, DOHC, Liquid cooled, Eight-valve, with counterbalancer |
| Displacement | 248 cc (15.1 cu in) |
| Bore and Stroke | 62.0 mm × 41.2 mm (2.44 in × 1.62 in) |
| Compression Ratio | 12.0:1 |
| Carburetion | Keihin CVK32 (2), Constant velocity, diaphragm-type. |
| Starting | Electric |
| Ignition | Electronic advance |
| Spark plug | NGK C8HA or ND U24FS-L (Canada: NGK CR8HS or ND U24FSR-U) |
| Fuel type | n/a |
Transmission
| Type | 6-speed manual, constant mesh, return shift |
| Clutch | Wet, multi-disc, manual, cable-actuated |
Frame/suspension
| Frame type | Tubular diamond |
| Rake/trail | 27° / 83 mm (3.3 in) |
| Front suspension | Twin hydraulic telescoping fork |
| Rear suspension | Uni-Trak single-shock system |
| Wheel travel, front | 140 mm (5.5 in) |
| Wheel travel, rear | 130 mm (5.1 in) |
Tires and brakes
| Tire, front | 100/80x16 |
| Tire, rear | 120/80x16 |
| Brakes | Single hydraulic disc |
Dimensions
| Wheelbase | 1,400 mm (55 in) |
| Overall length | 1,985 mm (78.1 in) |
| Overall width | 695 mm (27.4 in) |
| Overall height | 1,075 mm (42.3 in) |
| Ground clearance | 135 mm (5.3 in) |
| Seat height | 745 mm (29.3 in) |
| Weight (dry, wet) | 304 lb (138 kg) (California model 305 lb (138.5 kg)) dry, 341 lb (154.5 kg) (California model 342 lb (155 kg)) wet 344 lb (156 kg) wet, tested |
| Max load | n/a |
| Oil type/capacity | SE or SF Class SAE 10W40-20W50/1.9 L (2.0 US qt) |
Performance
| 0–60 mph (0–97 km/h) | n/a |
| Quarter mile | 15.4 s @ 87.82 mph (141.33 km/h) |
| Maximum speed | 94 mph (151 km/h) |
| Maximum power | 27.9 kW (37.4 hp) @ 11,000 rpm (Australia: 29.4 kW (39.4 hp) @ 12,500 rpm) |
| Maximum torque | 24.5 N⋅m (18.1 ft⋅lb) @ 10,000 rpm (Australia: 23.5 N⋅m (17.3 ft⋅lb) @ 11,000 rpm) |
| Fuel efficiency | 48 mpg_{‑US} (4.9 L/100 km; 58 mpg_{‑imp}) |

=== 1988–2007 (EX250-F/EX250-G/EX250-H) ===
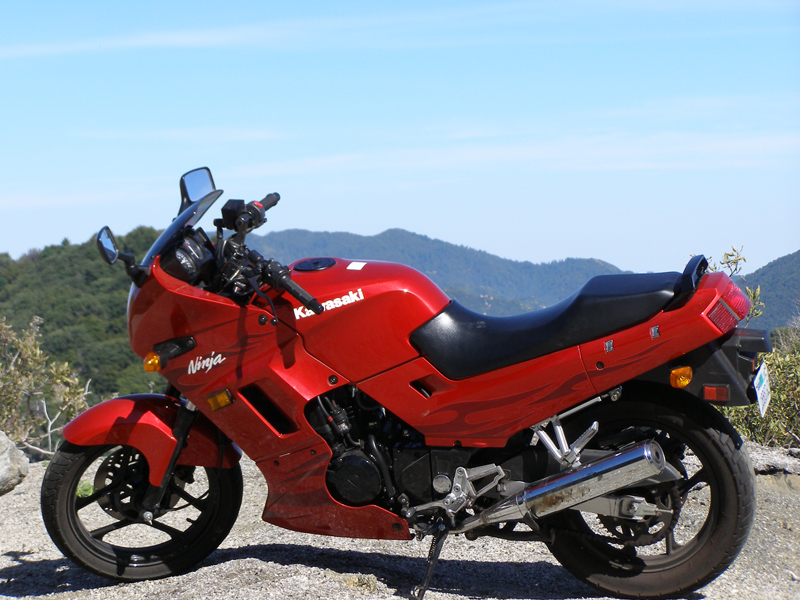
2006 Ninja 250R (EX250-F19)

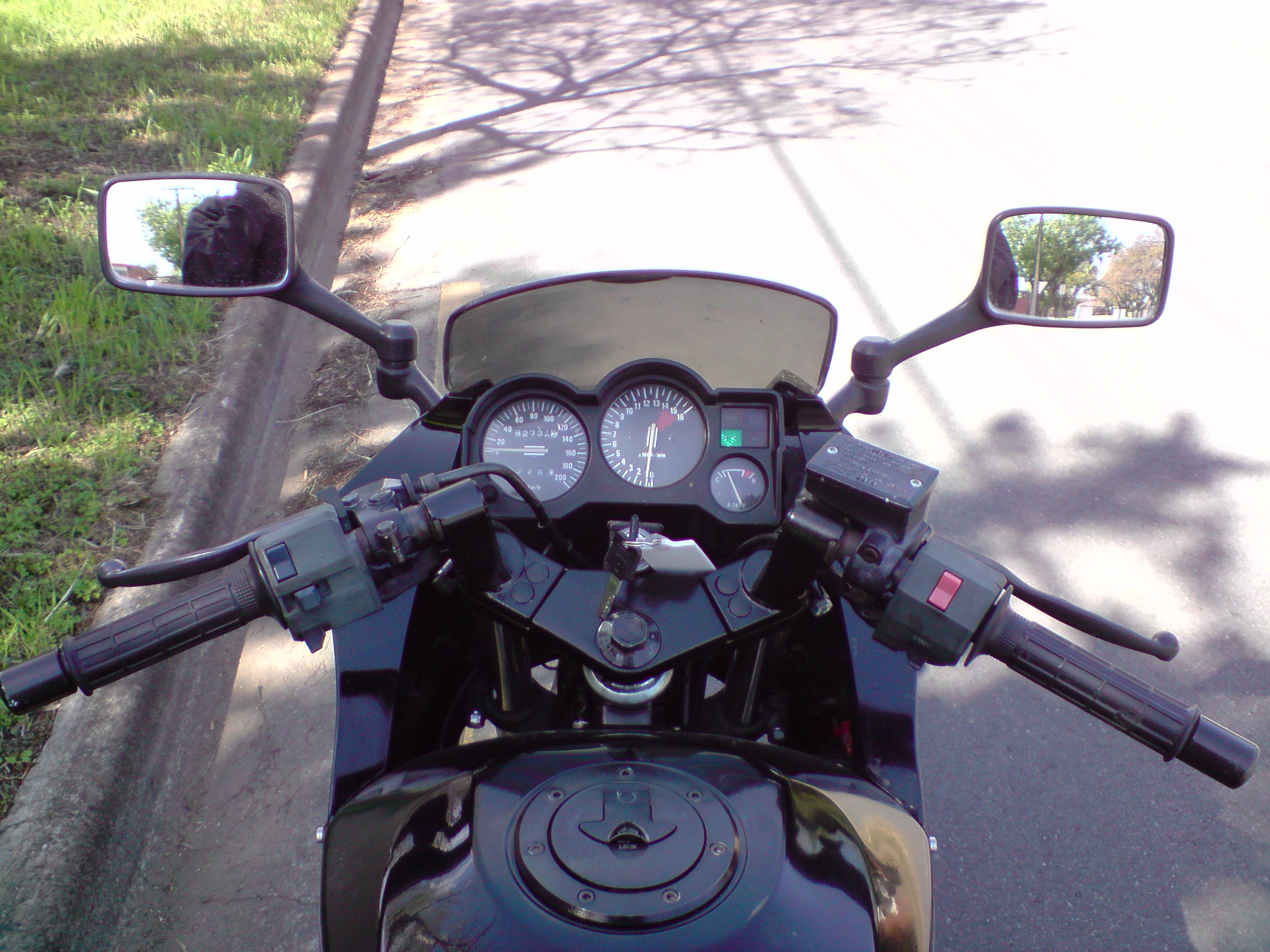
1993 GPX 250 cockpit

For the 1988 model year, there were both cosmetic changes and changes in engine tuning. While the bore and stroke, and other major engine components, were unchanged, minor tuning adjustments were made. The carburetor diameters were reduced 2 mm to 30 mm (1.2 in), the cylinder compression ratio was increased from 12.0:1 to 12.4:1, ignition timing advance was increased, and the rear sprocket was increased by three teeth to 45. Reviewers reported that this made the engine more free-revving, reaching the high 14,000 redline more quickly, and the tested top speed increased by a few miles per hour. The new, more fully enclosed bodywork was complimented for being stylish, at the time, and easily mistaken for the larger Ninja 750.

The third generation of production of the Ninja 250R encompassed three models:

- EX250-F - The most widespread EX250 variant, the E model was completely revamped and sold as the F model between 1988 and 2007 in the United States. Canada received the model between 1988 and 1999, and it was available elsewhere as the GPX-250R as early as 1987.

EX-250-F Specifications
Engine
| Type | Four-stroke Inline-twin, DOHC, Liquid-cooled, Eight-valve, with counterbalancer |
| Displacement | 248 cc |
| Bore and Stroke | 62.0 mm × 41.2 mm (2.44 in × 1.62 in) |
| Compression Ratio | 12.4:1 |
| Carburetion | Keihin CVK30 (2), Constant velocity, diaphragm-type. |
| Starting | Electric |
| Ignition | Electronic advance |
| Spark plug | NGK CR8HSA, CR8HIX, CR8HVX option CR7HSA, CR7HIX |
| Fuel type | Min 91 RON / 87 AKI octane unleaded |
Transmission
| Type | 6-speed manual, constant mesh, return shift |
| Clutch | Wet, multi-disc, manual, cable-actuated |
Frame/suspension
| Frame type | Tubular diamond design |
| Rake/trail | 27° / 84 mm (3.3 in) |
| Front suspension | Twin hydraulic telescoping fork |
| Rear suspension | Uni-Trak single-shock |
| Wheel travel, front | 140 mm (5.5 in) |
| Wheel travel, rear | 130 mm (5.1 in) |
Tires and brakes
| Tire, front | 100/80x16 |
| Tire, rear | 130/80x16 |
| Brakes | Single hydraulic disc (260mm front, 230mm rear) |
Dimensions
| Wheelbase | 1,400 mm (55.1 in) |
| Overall length | 2,030 mm (80.1 in) |
| Overall width | 710 mm (28 in) |
| Overall height | 1,090 mm (43.1 in) |
| Ground clearance | 150 mm (6.1 in) |
| Seat height | 740 mm (29.3 in) |
| Weight (dry, wet) | 138 kg (304 lb) dry, 161 kg (355 lb) wet 164 kg (362 lb) wet, tested |
| Max load | 155 kg (341 lb) |
| Oil type/capacity | SE-SG Class SAE 10W40-20W50/1.9 L |
Performance
| 0–60 mph (0–97 km/h) | 5.75 s |
| 1/4 mile | 14.59 s @ 87.82 mph (141.33 km/h) |
| Maximum power | 27.9 kW (37.4 hp); 28.05 bhp (20.92 kW) @ 12500 rpm |
| Maximum torque | 18 ft⋅lbf (24 N⋅m) @ 10,000 rpm 13.15 ft⋅lb (17.83 N⋅m) @ 9,000 rpm tested at rear wheel |
| Fuel efficiency | 48.0 mpg_{‑US} (4.90 L/100 km; 57.6 mpg_{‑imp}); 55 mpg_{‑US} (4.3 L/100 km; 66 mpg_{‑imp}); 74.2 mpg_{‑US} (3.17 L/100 km; 89.1 mpg_{‑imp}) |

- EX250-G - Sold only in its home market of Japan, this version was known as the GPX-250R-II. It had dual front brakes and a wider wheel and tire (110/80-16). All other parts were identical to the -F model. It was sold after 1988.
- EX250-H - This model came to Canada as the Ninja 250R between 2000 and 2002, after which it received a new name: ZZR-250, in line with the -H model's name elsewhere in the world, where it had existed since 1992. This motorcycle has parts in common with the -F model, though it shares the same engine, albeit with different casings. It sports a lateral aluminum frame, a different fairing (designed to make it look sportier), larger 17-inch wheels, an adjustable rear shock absorber, adjustable brake and clutch levers, a smaller drive sprocket, computer-controlled timing advance, and a revised electrical system. It also had a smaller carburetor, & slightly different compression ratio, both of which were designed for quicker revving and slightly higher top end power. However, these upgrades came at a 6 kg weight gain.

=== 2008–2012 (EX250-R) ===
EX250-R
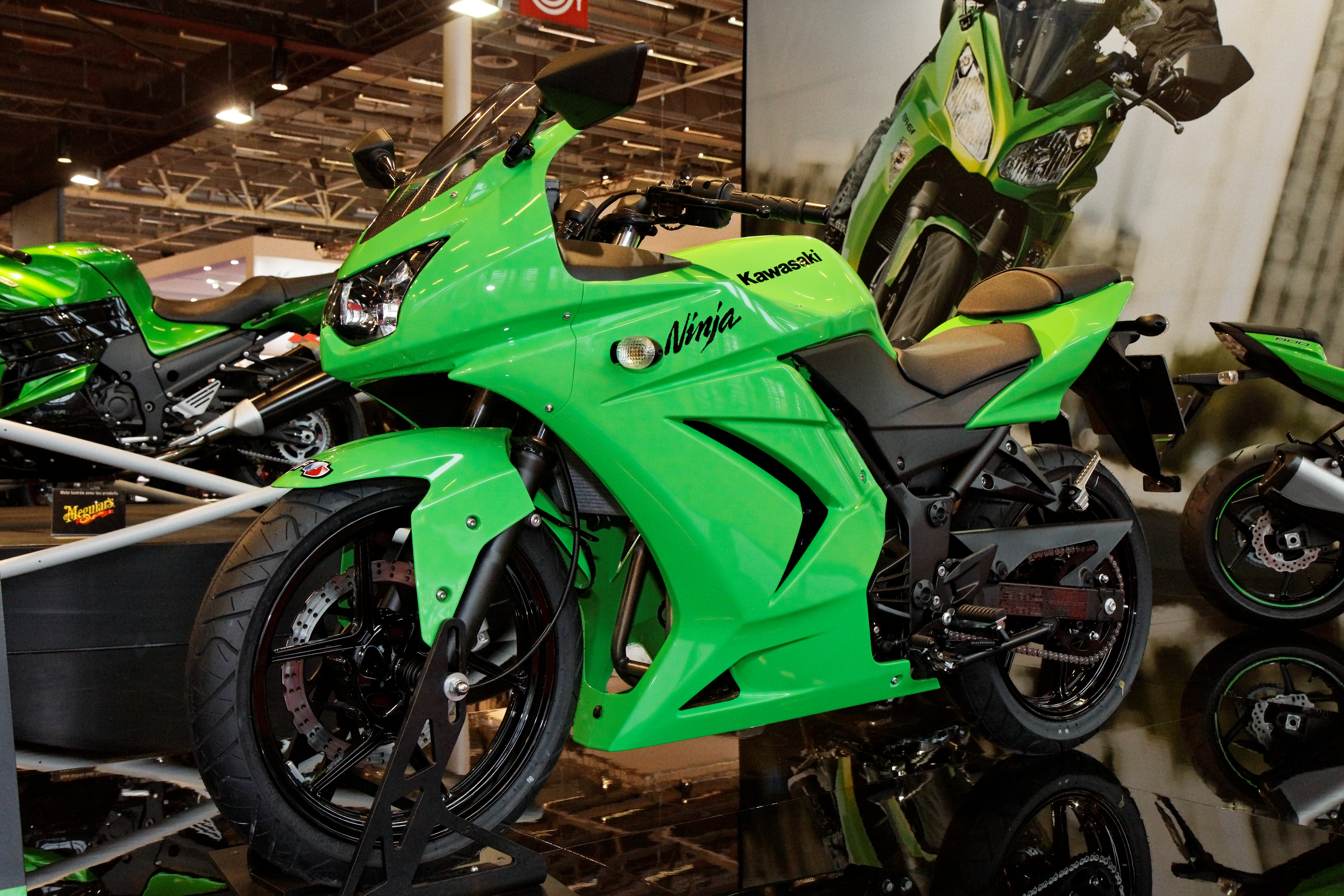
- Manufacturer: Kawasaki Motors
- Parent company: Kawasaki Heavy Industries
- Production: 2008–2012
- Successor: Kawasaki Ninja 300
- Engine: 249 cc (15.2 cu in) liquid-cooled 4-stroke 8-valve DOHC parallel-twin
- Bore / stroke: 62.0 mm × 41.2 mm (2.44 in × 1.62 in)
- Ignition type: TCBI with digital advance
- Transmission: 6-speed constant mesh
- Tires: Front: 110/70-17M/C; Rear: 130/70-17M/C
- Rake, trail: 26°
- Wheelbase: 1,399.5 mm (55.10 in)
- Dimensions: W: 713.7 mm (28.10 in); H: 1,109.9 mm (43.70 in)
- Seat height: 774.7 mm (30.50 in)
- Weight: 170 kg (375 lb) (wet)

In 2008, Kawasaki gave the EX250 its most extensive redesign in twenty years. The EX250-J model is known as the Ninja 250R worldwide, regardless of market.

Parts from the third generation are still found on the -J, but its redesigned exterior panels bring the Ninja's appearance out of the 1990s and into line with late-2000s sportbikes. The engine and drivetrain retain 30% of the -F model's parts, according to Kawasaki. The engine's compression and maximum peak-HP have been lowered to provide better midrange performance. The redesign of the engine resulted in improvements in engine response at low engine speeds, making the bike smoother and "much easier to ride."

Though the previous generation Ninja 250R had a peak power advantage of 1 to 5 hp (0.75 to 3.73 kW), the new version's 20 or 30 percent increase in mid-range power allows the bike to pull from 3,000 rpm where previously it had to be revved to 4,000 rpm. The U.S., Canadian and Australian -J model uses dual carburetors like the -F model, but Rest of World models have fuel injection. The wheels were increased in size to 17 inches, the front suspension was improved, and the brake rotors were replaced with a larger petal shape. On the carbureted version, a fuel gauge was added in place of the temperature gauge. With the additional and redesigned equipment, the EX250-J suffered a 10 kg (22 lb) increase in wet weight over its predecessors.

With the arrival of the EX250-J, manufacturing continues to be located in Thailand.

EX250-J Specifications
Engine
| Type | Four-stroke Inline-twin, DOHC, Liquid cooled, Eight-valve, with counterbalancer |
| Displacement | 249 cc |
| Bore and Stroke | 62.0 mm × 41.2 mm (2.44 in × 1.62 in) |
| Compression Ratio | 11.6:1 |
| Carburetion | Keihin CVK30 (2), Constant velocity, diaphragm-type. Fuel injection for Europe and Thailand Euro/Thai model |
| Starting | Electric |
| Ignition | Electronic advance |
| Spark plug | NGK CR8E, CR8EIX |
| Fuel type | Min 91 Research / 87 avg. octane unleaded |
Transmission
| Type | 6-speed manual, constant mesh, return shift |
| Clutch | Wet, multi-disc, manual, cable-actuated |
Frame/suspension
| Frame type | Tubular diamond design |
| Rake/trail | 26°/83 mm (3.26 in) |
| Front suspension | Twin hydraulic telescoping fork |
| Rear suspension | Uni-Trak with 5-setting adjustable preload |
| Wheel travel, front | 120 mm (4.7 in) |
| Wheel travel, rear | 130 mm (5.1 in) |
Tires and brakes
| Tire, front | 110/70×17 (54H) |
| Tire, rear | 130/70×17 (62H) |
| Brakes | Single hydraulic disc, front 290 mm (11.4 in), rear 220 mm (8.7 in) |
Dimensions
| Wheelbase | 1,400 mm (55.1 in) |
| Overall length | 2,090 mm (82.1 in) |
| Overall width | 710 mm (28.1 in) |
| Overall height | 1,110 mm (43.7 in) |
| Ground clearance | 150 mm (6.1 in) |
| Seat height | 770 mm (30.5 in) |
| Dry Weight | 151 kg (333 lb) - 153 kg (337 lb) (CA-model) |
| Wet Weight | 170 kg (375 lb) |
| Max load | 170 kg (375 lb) |
| Oil type/capacity | SE-SG Class SAE 10W40-20W50/1.9 L |
Performance
| 0–60 mph (0–97 km/h) | 7.72 sec. |
| 1/4 mile | 15.58 sec. @ 81.98 mph (131.93 km/h) |
| Maximum speed | 92 mph (148 km/h); 95.5 mph (153.7 km/h); 97.7 mph (157.2 km/h) |
| Maximum power | 19.46 kW (26.09 hp) @ 11,000 rpm (rear wheel); 32 PS (24 kW) (crank) |
| Maximum torque | 18.4 N⋅m (13.6 lb⋅ft) @ 9,750 rpm |
| Fuel capacity | 18 L; 4.0 imp gal (4.8 US gal) |
| Fuel efficiency | 4.59 L/100 km; 61.5 mpg_{‑imp} (51.2 mpg_{‑US}); 3.9 L/100 km; 73 mpg_{‑imp} (61 mpg_{‑US}) (claimed) |

=== 2013–2017 (EX250-L/EX250-M) ===
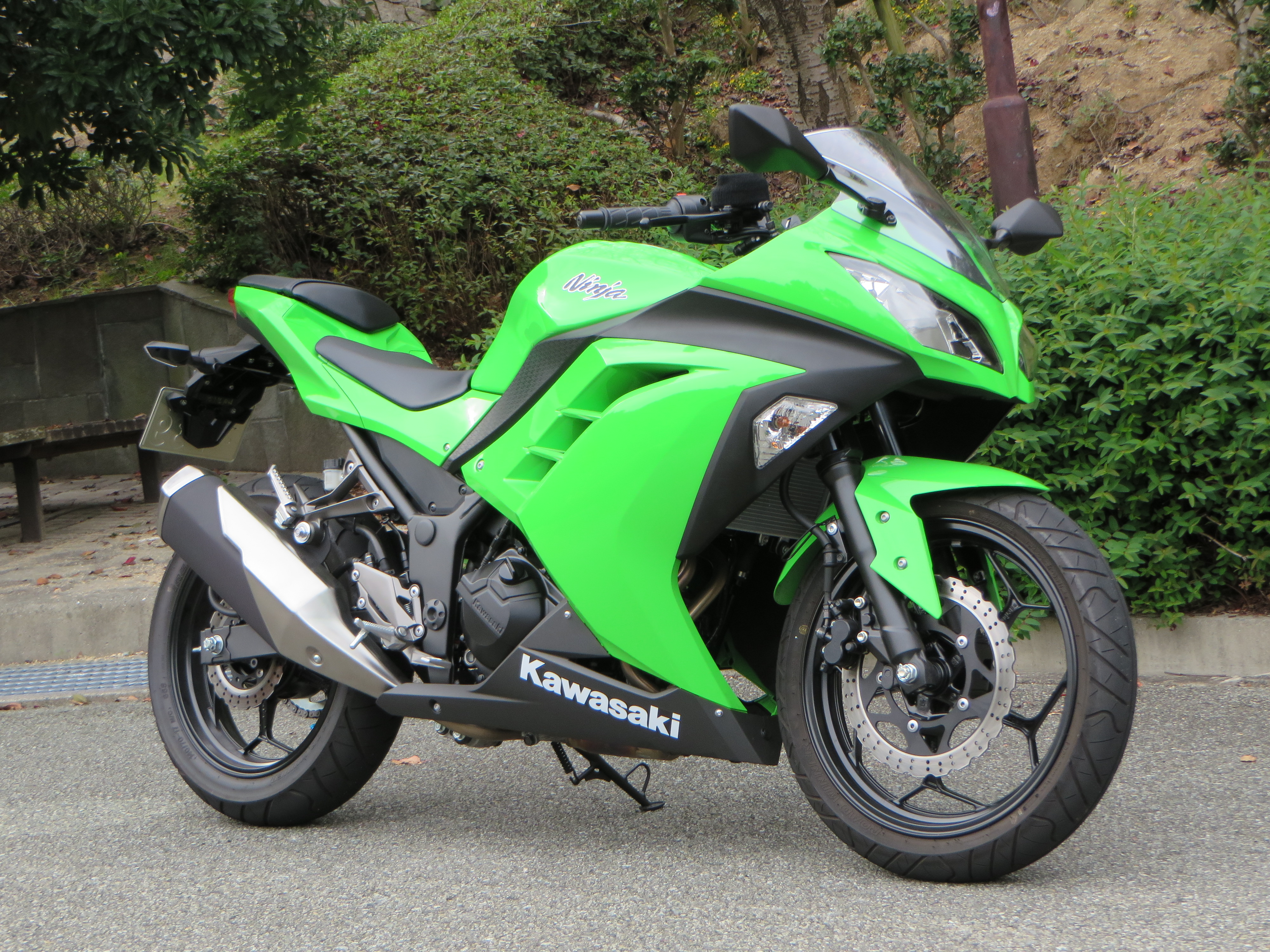
2013 Ninja 250R (EX250-L)

The 2013 Ninja 250R had a new bodywork, twin headlights, a digital instruments cluster, new wheels with a wider 140 mm (5.5 in) rear tire, and a reworked engine and exhaust. ABS is available as an option. Like the previous generation, the engine is fuel injected in some markets and carbureted in others. For 2013, in some markets, the Ninja 250R was replaced by the 296 cc (18.1 cu in) Ninja 300 (EX300), while in others they are sold alongside one other.

=== 2018– (EX250-P) ===
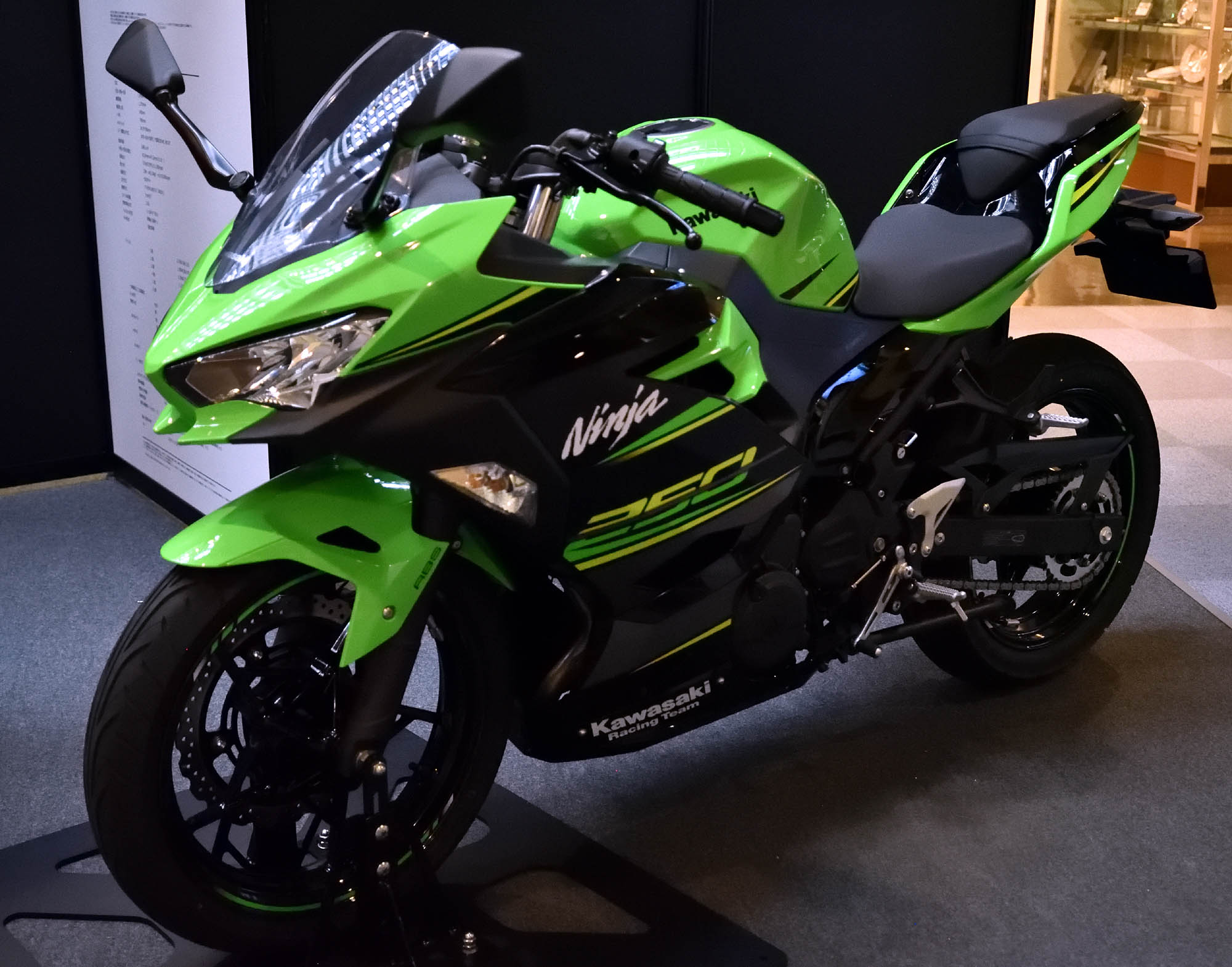
2018 Ninja 250R

At the 2017 Tokyo Motor Show, Kawasaki introduced the 2018 Ninja 250R along with the all-new 2018 Ninja 400, with the latter to be sold in Europe and America, replacing the Ninja 300.

Kawasaki once again did a major redesign on the 2018 Ninja 250R, giving it a new lightweight steel tube trellis chassis and completely reworked engine. The new Ninja's chassis and engine uses the Kawasaki H2's Platform Technology, by having the rear suspension, chassis and swingarm connected to the four point engine mounting thus, boosting its rigidity while retaining the benefit of a lighter chassis. Fuel tank capacity has been reduced, from the previous 17 litres to 14 litres. It now weighs 167kg against previous model's 172kg.

The new engine although, had some resemblance to the old engine, had gone through some extensive changes. The engine makes 39hp @ 23.5NM Torque at 10,000RPM.

== See also ==
- Kawasaki Ninja series
