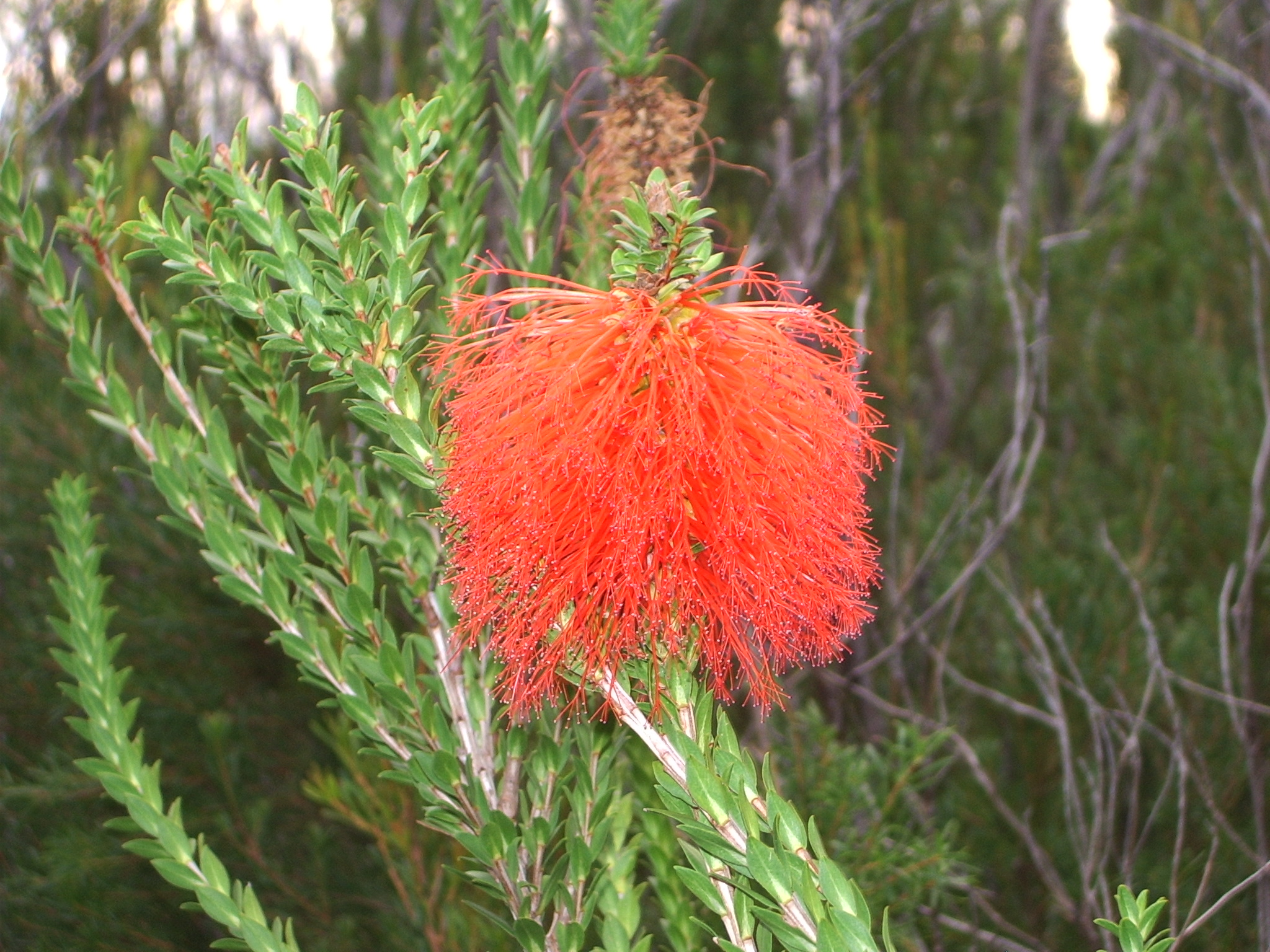
- Near Albany

Scientific classification
- Kingdom: Plantae
- Clade: Tracheophytes
- Clade: Angiosperms
- Clade: Eudicots
- Clade: Rosids
- Order: Myrtales
- Family: Myrtaceae
- Genus: Beaufortia
- Species: B. sparsa

Binomial name
- Beaufortia sparsa R.Br.

Synonyms
- Beaufortia splendens G.Don nom. inval., nom. nud.; Beaufortia splendens Baxter ex A.Dietr.; Melaleuca sparsa (R.Br.) Craven & R.D.Edwards

= Beaufortia sparsa =

Species of flowering plant

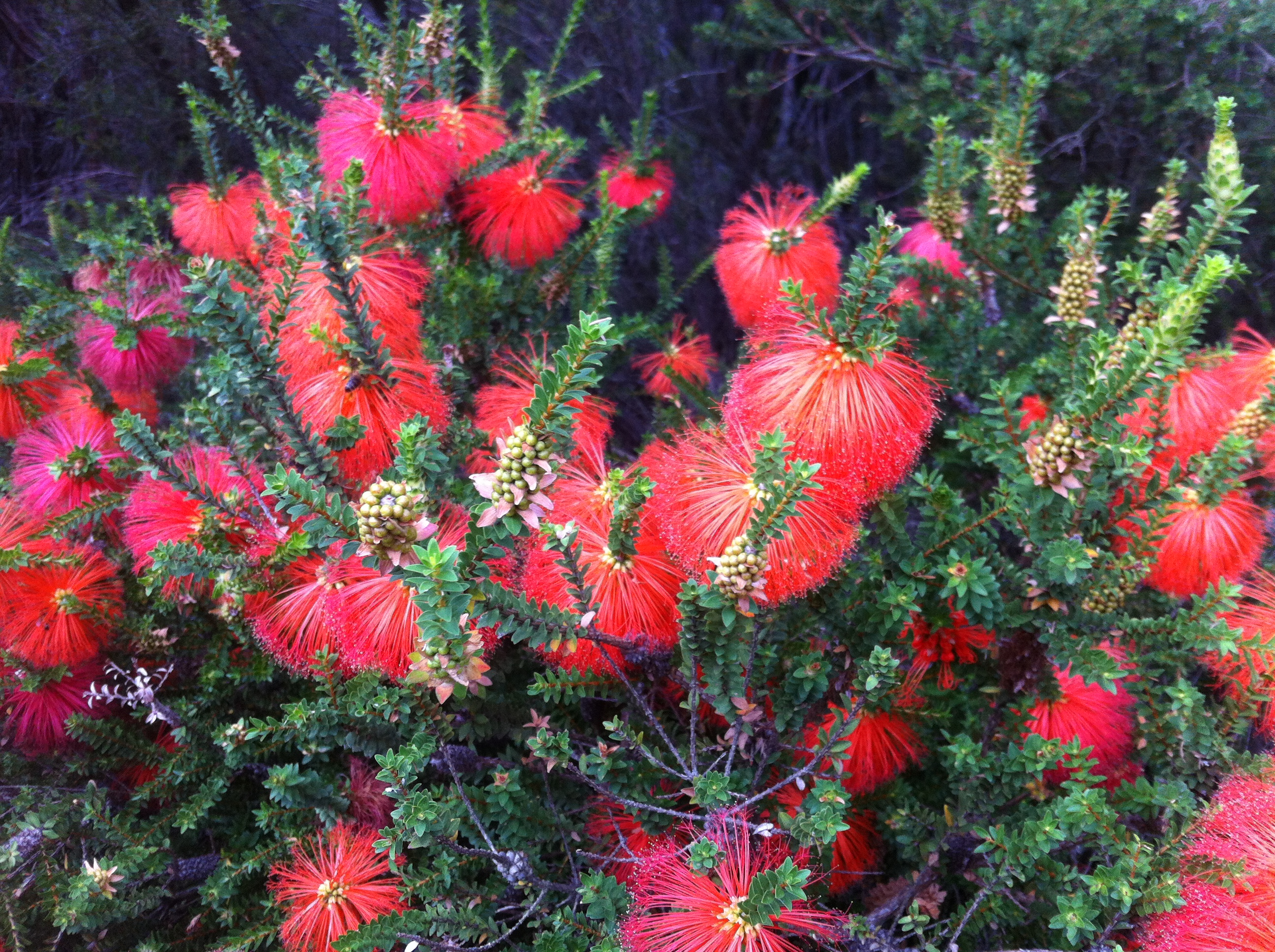
Near Two Peoples Bay

Beaufortia sparsa, commonly known as swamp bottlebrush, is a plant in the myrtle family Myrtaceae, and is endemic to the southwest of Western Australia. It is an erect or spreading shrub with round, dished leaves crowded on the younger stems, and bright red flower spikes in the warmer months.

== Description ==
Beaufortia sparsa is an evergreen shrub that grows to 1–3 metres (3–10 ft) tall and 1–2.5 metres (3–8 ft) wide. The leaves are bright green, oval-shaped, flat or slightly dished, 6–12 millimetres (0.2–0.5 in) long and have many veins.

The flowers are bright orange to red in colour and arranged in bottlebrush-like spikes near the ends of the branches that continue to grow after flowering. The flowers have 5 sepals, 5 petals and 5 bundles of stamens each containing about 5 stamens. The hypanthium is about 2 millimetres (0.08 in) long but the stamens, which give the flowers their colour, are up to 26 millimetres (1 in) long. Flowers are produced from January to April and from September to November and are followed by fruits which are woody capsules which are retained on the stems indefinitely.

== Taxonomy and naming ==
Beaufortia sparsa was first formally described in 1812 by Scottish botanist, Robert Brown in William Aiton's Hortus Kewensis. The specific epithet ("sparsa") is a Latin word meaning "scattered", referring to the species being scattered in swamps.

== Distribution and habitat ==
Beaufortia sparsa mainly occurs between Busselton and Albany in the Esperance Plains, Jarrah Forest, Swan Coastal Plain and Warren bioregions of south-western Western Australia. It usually grows in sand in swampy places or near watercourses.

== Conservation ==
Beaufortia orbifolia is classified as "not threatened" by the Western Australian Government Department of Biodiversity, Conservation and Attractions.

== Use in horticulture ==
Swamp bottlebrush is probably the most widely cultivated in the genus Beaufortia but it is not well known in gardens. It is difficult to grow in the more humid eastern states but in drier climates is a colourful feature.
