= Kawasaki Z300 =

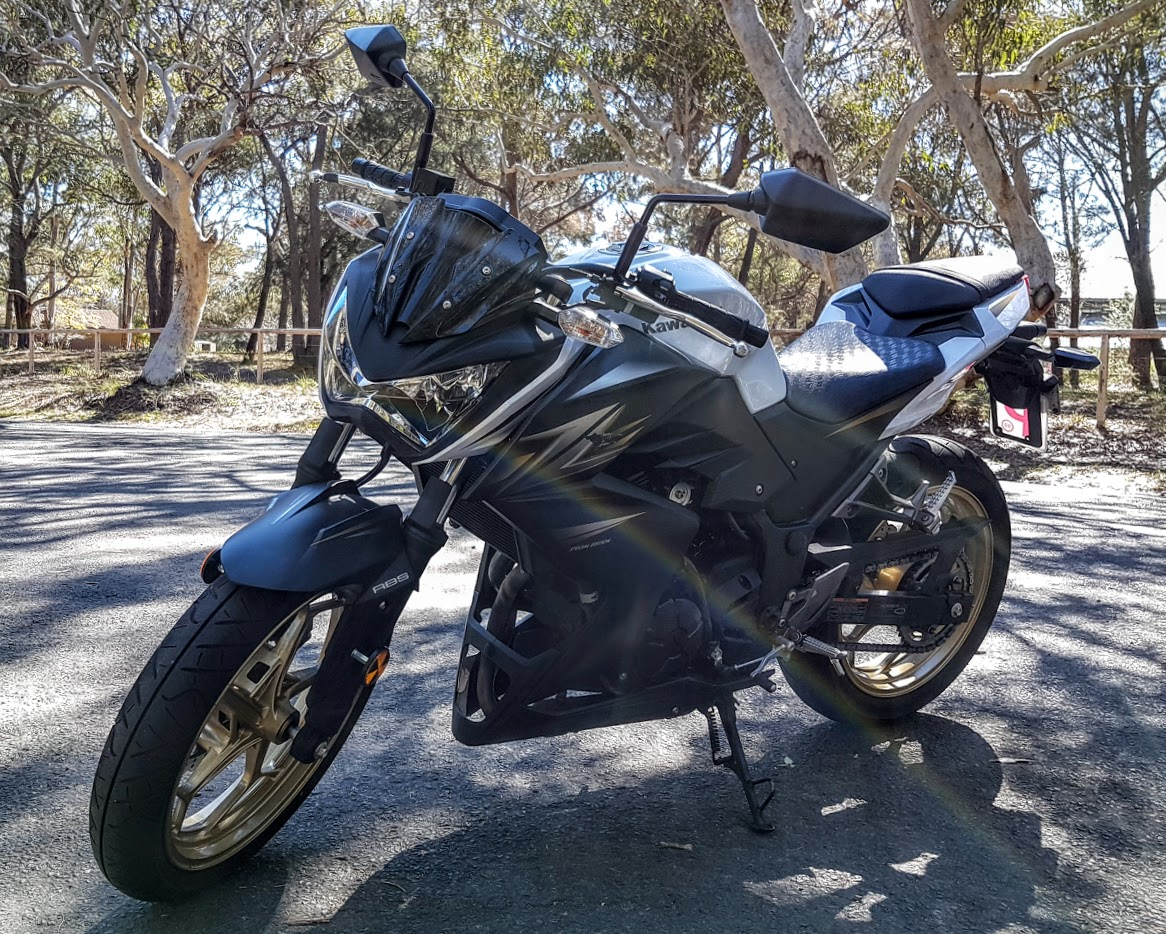
- Manufacturer: Kawasaki Motors
- Parent company: Kawasaki Heavy Industries
- Production: 2015–2018
- Successor: Kawasaki Z400
- Class: Standard
- Engine: 296 cc (18.1 cu in) liquid-cooled 4-stroke 8-valve DOHC parallel-twin
- Bore / stroke: 62.0 mm × 49.0 mm (2.4 in × 1.9 in)
- Compression ratio: 10.6:1
- Top speed: 182 km/h (113 mph) (estimated)
- Power: 29 kW (38.9 hp; 39.4 PS) @ 11,000 rpm (claimed)
- Torque: 27 N⋅m (20 lbf⋅ft) @ 10,000 rpm (claimed)
- Ignition type: CDI
- Transmission: 6-speed constant-mesh, chain final drive
- Frame type: Steel tubular diamond
- Suspension: Front: 37 mm (1.5 in) telescopic fork, 120 mm (4.7 in) travel; Rear: Steel swingarm with monoshock and 5-way adjustable spring preload, 132 mm (5.2 in) travel
- Brakes: Front: Dual-piston caliper with single 290 mm (11.4 in) disc; Rear: Dual-piston caliper with single 220 mm (8.7 in) disc
- Tires: Front: 110/70-17 54S (tubeless); Rear: 140/70-17 66S (tubeless)
- Rake, trail: 26°, 82 mm (3.2 in)
- Wheelbase: 1,405 mm (55.3 in)
- Dimensions: L: 2,015 mm (79.3 in); W: 750 mm (29.5 in); H: 1,025 mm (40.4 in)
- Seat height: 785 mm (30.9 in)
- Weight: 170 kg (370 lb) (wet)
- Fuel capacity: 17 L (3.7 imp gal; 4.5 US gal)
- Fuel consumption: 24.78 km/L (70.0 mpg_{‑imp}; 58.3 mpg_{‑US})
- Range: 420 km (261 miles)
- Related: Kawasaki Ninja 300; Kawasaki Z250

The Kawasaki Z300 (codenamed ER300) is a standard motorcycle manufactured by Kawasaki. It was introduced in 2014 at the Milan Motorcycle Show as part of its Z series for the 2015 model year. It is sold in Asia, Australia, Europe and South America, and designed and marketed as the streetfighter version of the Ninja 300.

== Components ==
=== Engine ===
The Z300 is powered by a 296 cc (18.1 cu in) liquid-cooled 4-stroke 8-valve DOHC parallel-twin engine. Kawasaki claims the Z300 produces a maximum power output of 29 kW (38.9 hp; 39.4 PS) at 11,000 rpm and a maximum torque of 27 N⋅m (20 lbf⋅ft) at 10,000 rpm. Reliable third party dynamometer testing results have not been published.

=== Clutch ===
Like the Ninja 300, the Z300 has a wet multi-disc clutch with slipper and assist functions to relieve pressure generated by rapid downshifting, and lighten the clutch pull.

=== Wheels ===
The Z300 comes stock with 17" diameter and 4" wide multi-spoke rims, fitted with IRC Road Winner bias ply tires. The stock tires are sized 110/70-17 54S front, and 140/70-17 66S rear.

== Performance ==
Its top speed has been estimated to be just over 182 km/h (113 mph).

MCN reports an average of 70 mpg_{‑imp} (4.0 L/100 km; 58 mpg_{‑US}) and Visordown reports 58.4 mpg_{‑US} (4.03 L/100 km; 70.1 mpg_{‑imp}). This translates to a range of around 420 km (261 miles).
