= Kawasaki Ninja 400 =

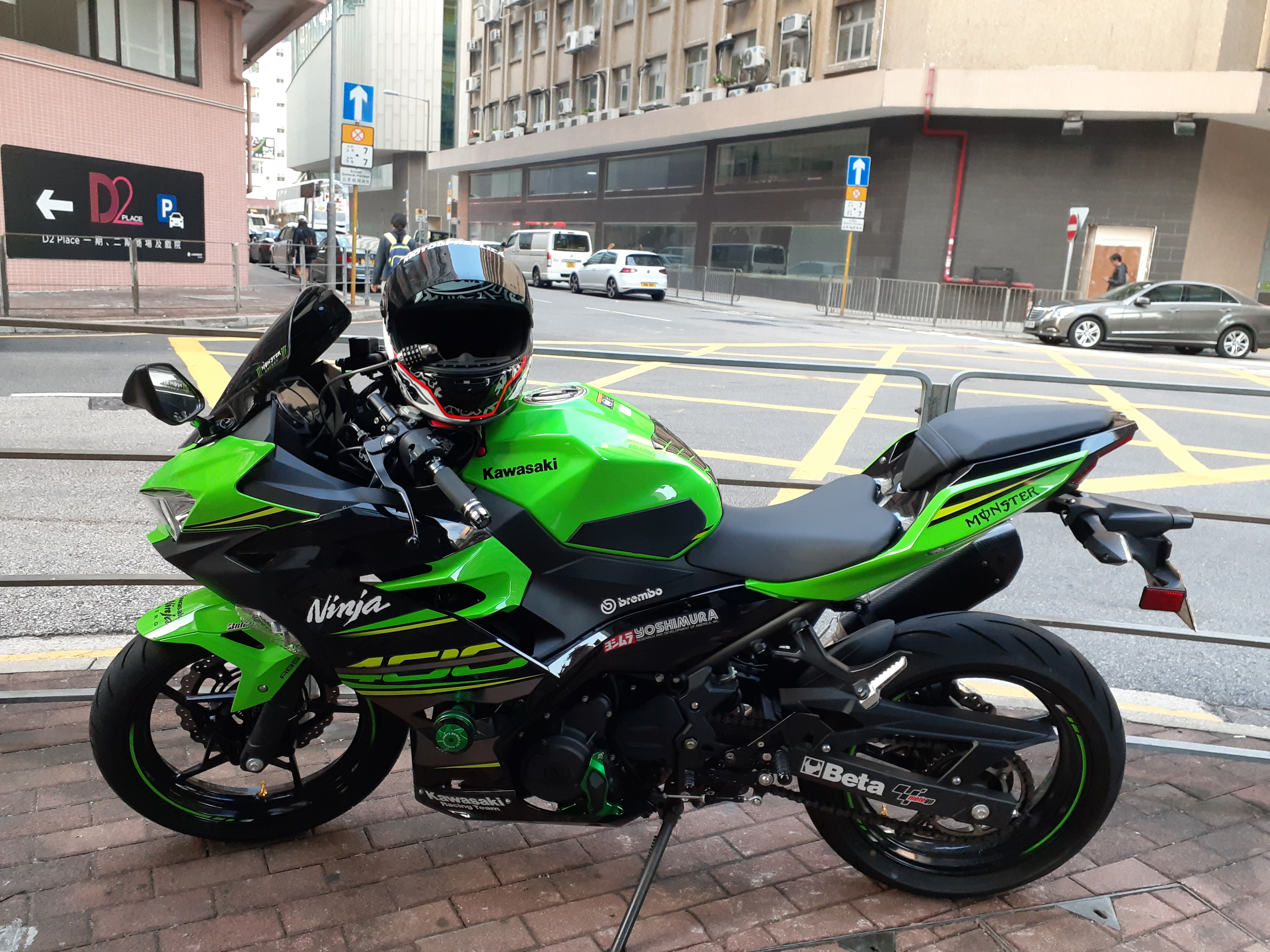
- Manufacturer: Kawasaki Motors
- Parent company: Kawasaki Heavy Industries
- Production: 2018–current
- Assembly: Rayong, Thailand; Manaus, Brazil
- Predecessor: Kawasaki Ninja 300
- Class: Sportbike
- Engine: 399 cc (24.3 cu in) liquid-cooled 4-stroke 8-valve DOHC parallel-twin
- Bore / stroke: 70.0 mm × 51.8 mm (2.8 in × 2.0 in)
- Compression ratio: 11.5:1
- Power: 33.4–36.5 kW (44.8–49 hp) @ 10,000 rpm (claimed); 32.3 kW (43.3 hp) @ 9,900 rpm (rear wheel)
- Torque: 38 N⋅m (28 lb⋅ft) @ 8,000 rpm (claimed); 33.4 N⋅m (24.6 lb⋅ft) @ 8,250 rpm (rear wheel)
- Transmission: Six-speed, chain drive
- Frame type: Steel diamond with truss structure
- Suspension: Front: 41 mm (1.6 in) non-adjustable telescopic fork, (4.72 in.) wheel travel Rear: gas charged monoshock with 5-way adjustable preload, (5.1 in.) wheel travel
- Brakes: Front: Dual-piston caliper with single 310 mm (12.2 in) disc Rear: Single-piston caliper with single 220 mm (8.7 in) disc
- Tires: Front: 110/70–17 (tubeless); Rear: 150/60–17 (tubeless)
- Dimensions: L: 1,990 mm (78.3 in); W: 710 mm (28.0 in); H: 1,120 mm (44.1 in)
- Seat height: 785 mm (30.9 in)
- Weight: 168 kg (370 lb) (wet)
- Fuel capacity: 14 L (3.1 imp gal; 3.7 US gal)
- Range: 210 miles (340 km) claimed
- Related: Kawasaki Ninja 250; Kawasaki Z400

The Kawasaki Ninja 400 is a 399 cc Ninja series sport bike introduced by Kawasaki in 2018, as a successor to the Ninja 300. It launched with the 2018 model year.

The Ninja 300 was struggling through Euro 4 emission standards compliance. Therefore, Kawasaki decided to replace it with the Ninja 400 for the 2018 model year. It also has significant upgrades in engine, frame, suspension, and other parts.

== Design ==
The new bike's styling is similar to Ninja H2 and Ninja ZX-10R (such as ‘chin-spoilers’ below twin headlamps) and dashboard (information gauge cluster) from Ninja 650. Despite having larger displacement, it is 17.6 lb (8.0 kg) lighter than the Ninja 300. It has a steel trellis frame with engine as a stressed member resulting in weight reduction of 6 kg (13 lb) and LED headlights and taillights. The engine has a large air-box for intake efficiency along with downdraft air intake. Seat height is 30mm lower than Ninja 300, improving stand-over. It is available with ABS and comes equipped with a slipper clutch. The pull on the clutch is 20% lighter than that of the Ninja 300.

The suspension is stiffer than the Ninja 300 with a larger (41 mm) fork. There are stiffer 5-spoke wheels, similar to the Ninja 650, resulting in low unsprung weight and better cornering stability than predecessors.

== History ==
=== Announcement ===
The 2018 Ninja 400 was revealed at 2017 Tokyo Motor Show. It is intended for the global market, and Euro 4 compliance suggested that the bike will be brought to Europe market. Kawasaki launched in US on December 1, 2017.

It was launched in Japan in February 2018.

The Ninja 400 launched in India in April 2018. It is assembled locally in India at Kawasaki's manufacturing plant in Chakan, Maharashtra. In India, it does not replace the Ninja 300, instead it is sold alongside the Ninja 300. The Ninja 250R is no longer on Kawasaki India's current products list, leaving Z250 the only bike in 250cc category offered by Kawasaki.

=== 2022 update ===
The engine was made Euro 5 compliant and new colors became available.

The Z400 was released at a price of ฿216,200 (US$6,760.48) in Thailand. In Germany, the Z400 was released at €6,745 (US$7,977.31).

In the United States, the Ninja 400 was replaced by the bigger-engined and reskinned Ninja 500 and Z500 for the 2024 model year, but the model continues to be available in numerous other markets including Japan.

=== Electric variant ===
In November 2022, Kawasaki announced it would produce a Ninja sport bike with an electric drivetrain. Regulatory documents filed with the Australian government in 2023 show the bike will be marketed as the Ninja e-1, using the same basic chassis as the Ninja 400 and Z400.

== Gallery ==
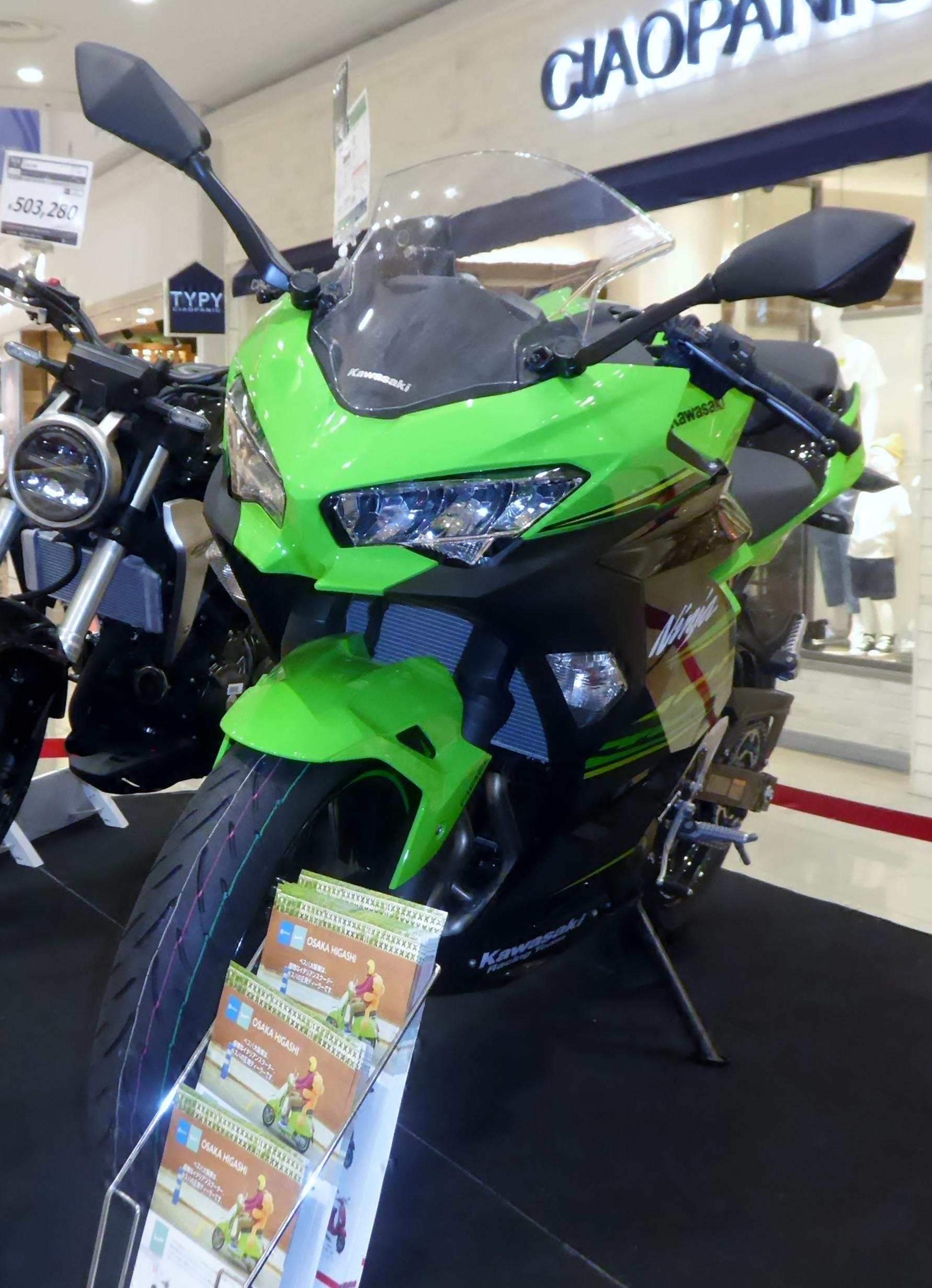
2017 Ninja 400

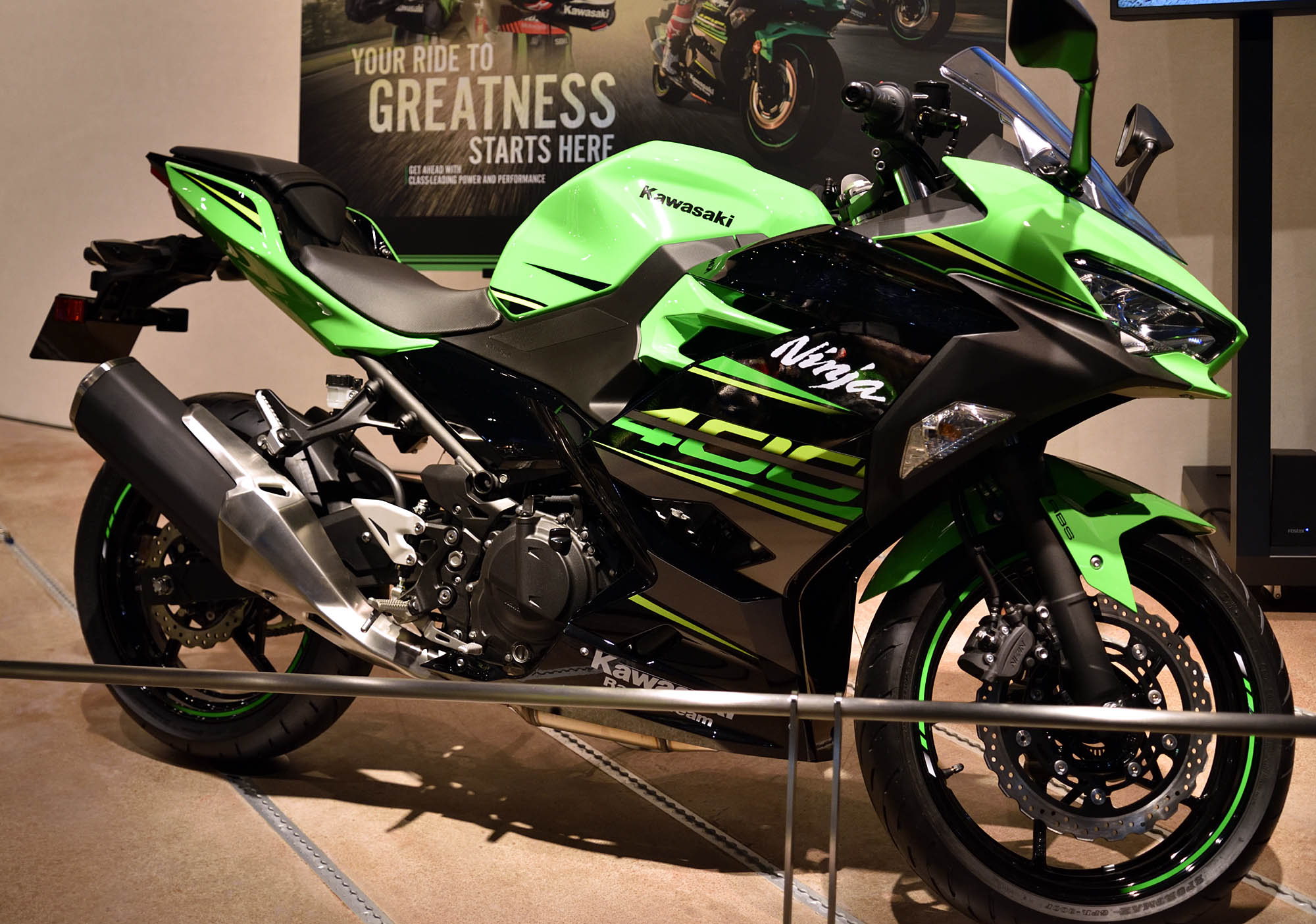
2018 Ninja 400

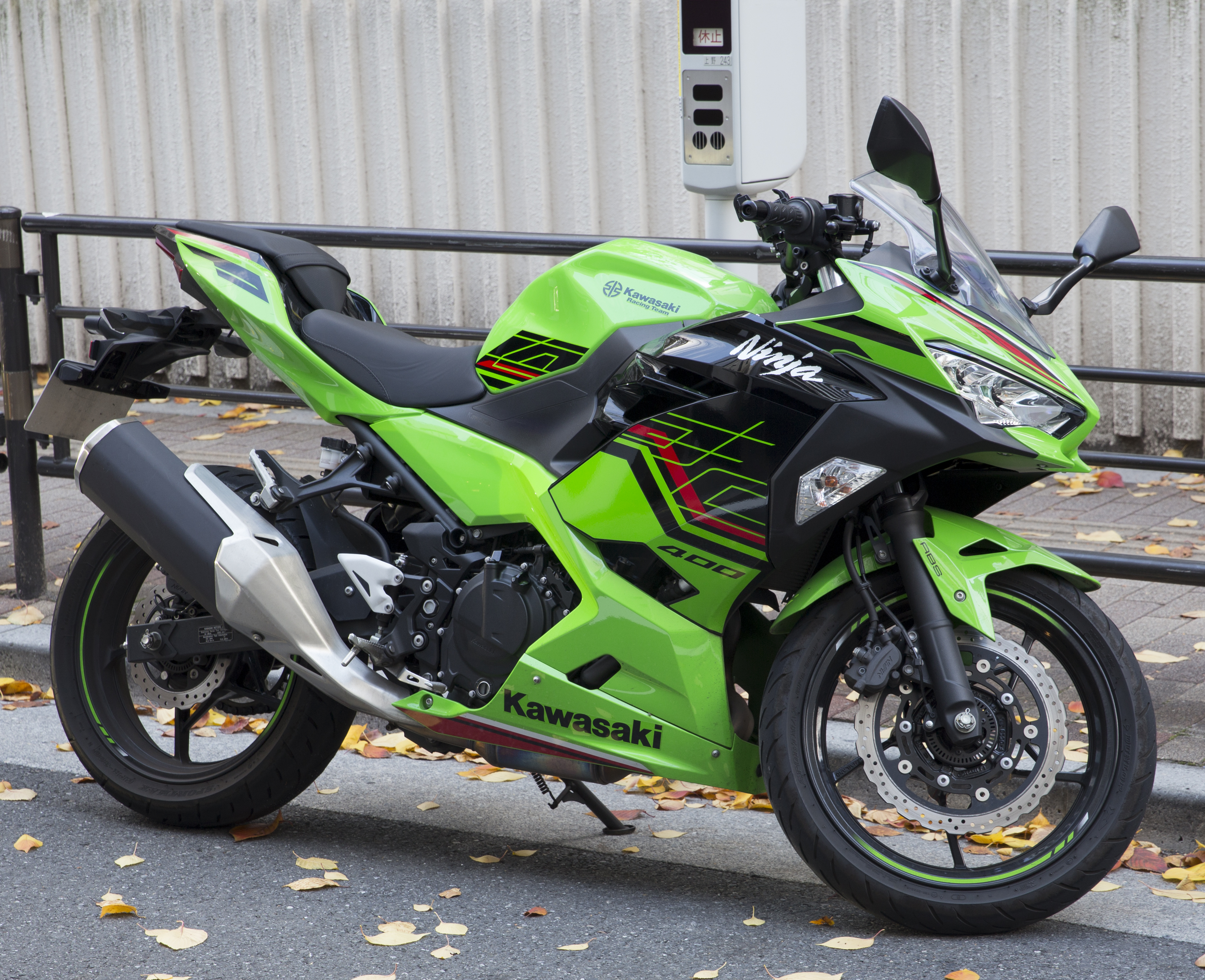
Ninja 400 KRT Edition

== See also ==
- Kawasaki Ninja Series
- Yamaha R3
- KTM 390 series
