= WA Sporting Car Club =

Motorsport organisation in Western Australia

- Abbreviation: WASCC
- Formation: 1929; 97 years ago
- Type: Sports Club
- Headquarters: Neerabup, Western Australia
- Website: wascc.asn.au

The WA Sporting Car Club is a motorsport organisation that has been in operation for nearly 100 years in the state of Western Australia.

== Early years ==
The club was involved in the development of flying mile speed contests in 1932, as well as the Albany Speed Classic in 1936.

In the 1930s, activities included hill climbs, open events, organisation of country events, speed tests, and trials, including events previously run by the Royal Automobile Club of Western Australia.

It had also operated from other raceways, including the Caversham Raceway, the Brooklands Track (1930s West Subiaco), Nicholson Road, Cannington track, as well as country locations.

== Race Track ==
In the 1969, The club opened Wanneroo Park Raceway, Now known as Carco.com.au Raceway, and operate it to this day.

== Publications ==
The Club has had a range of periodicals that have included other clubs and related sports based in Western Australia over the years.

- Monthly news (1950-1951)
- The visor (1951-1971)
- Newsletter - later called 20/20 looking to the future of motorsport in WA
- The racing line
