= Kawasaki Ninja 300 =

- Manufacturer: Kawasaki Motors
- Also called: EX300
- Parent company: Kawasaki Heavy Industries
- Production: 2013–Current
- Assembly: Rayong, Thailand (2012-2017); Pune, India (2018-Current)
- Predecessor: Kawasaki Ninja 250R
- Successor: Kawasaki Ninja 400
- Class: Sport bike
- Engine: 296 cc (18.1 cu in) liquid-cooled 4-stroke 8-valve DOHC parallel-twin
- Bore / stroke: 62 mm × 49 mm (2.4 in × 1.9 in)
- Compression ratio: 10.6:1
- Top speed: 171–192 km/h (106–119 mph)
- Power: 29 kW (39 hp) @ 11,000 rpm (claimed)
- Torque: 23.66 N⋅m (17.45 lb⋅ft) @ 9750 rpm 27 N⋅m (20 lbf⋅ft) @ 10000 rpm (claimed)
- Ignition type: CDI
- Transmission: Slipper clutch, 6-speed, chain
- Frame type: Steel tubular semi-double cradle
- Suspension: Front: telescopic fork; 120 mm (4.7 in) travel Rear: preload adjustable 130 mm (5.2 in) travel
- Brakes: Front: 290 mm disc & rear: 220 mm disc. ABS option
- Tires: Front: 110/70-17; Rear:140/70-17
- Rake, trail: 27°, 93 mm (3.7 in)
- Wheelbase: 1,405 mm (55.3 in)
- Dimensions: L: 2,015 mm (79.3 in); W: 715 mm (28.1 in); H: 1,110 mm (44 in)
- Seat height: 785 mm (30.9 in)
- Weight: 164 kg (362 lb) (dry); 174.6 kg (385.0 lb) (wet)
- Fuel capacity: 17.0 L (3.7 imp gal; 4.5 US gal)
- Fuel consumption: 70 mpg_{‑US} (3.4 L/100 km; 84 mpg_{‑imp}); 54.1 mpg_{‑US} (4.35 L/100 km; 65.0 mpg_{‑imp})
- Related: Kawasaki Ninja 250R; Kawasaki Z300

The Kawasaki Ninja 300, or EX300, is a 296 cc (18.1 cu in) Ninja series sport bike introduced by Kawasaki in 2012 for the 2013 model year. It is sold in Asia, Australia, Europe, and North America. When introduced, the Ninja 300R replaced the Ninja 250R in some markets, and in others they were sold alongside each other. When the 2018 model year Ninja 400 was introduced, it replaced the 300 in some markets.

== Design ==
The Ninja 300 is based on the Ninja 250R, a lightweight and inexpensive sport bike in production for over three decades. Like the Ninja 250R, it has a full fairing, but a wider rear tire, 140/70, instead of the 130/70 on the 250R. The Ninja 300 also has 5 spoke wheels, neutral finder, and optional antilock braking system (ABS). By comparison with the 250R, the Ninja 300 also has a slightly smaller fuel tank, taller gearing, and a back-torque-limiting slipper clutch with an assist mechanism that decreases clutch lever effort. Despite being a sport bike, it has comfortable ergonomics (such as windscreen effectively protecting from wind blast) which promotes commuting.

== Performance ==
The Ninja 300 has a 296 cc (18.1 cu in) straight-twin engine. Dynamometer tests showed that the Ninja 300 produces more power with 39.95 hp (29.79 kW) compared with the 250's 25.48 hp (19.00 kW), and higher torque across the rev range at 18 to 13.57 lb⋅ft (24.40 to 18.40 N⋅m).

Its top speed has been recorded at 180 km/h (112 mph) and acceleration at 5.6 seconds from 0 to 97 km/h (0 to 60 mph), and around 14.5 seconds at 141.14 to 145.77 km/h (87.7 to 90.58 mph) in the quarter mile. The stopping distance from 97 to 0 km/h (60 to 0 mph) of the ABS model was 38.0 to 41.1 m (124.6 to 135 ft).

The Ninja 300's fuel economy was measured at around 70 mpg_{‑US} (3.4 L/100 km; 84 mpg_{‑imp}), while other sources reported it at 54.1 mpg_{‑US} (4.35 L/100 km; 65.0 mpg_{‑imp}), though regardless of the methodology, the 300 showed improved gas mileage over the Ninja 250R.

== Rivals ==
The Ninja 300 competes with (and is commonly compared with) other entry-level (300/250 cc) bikes such as Yamaha R3, KTM RC390, Suzuki GSX250R and Honda CBR300R.

== Replacement ==
In an effort to increase its compliance with Euro IV, Kawasaki released the Ninja 400 which replaced the Ninja 300 in most markets.

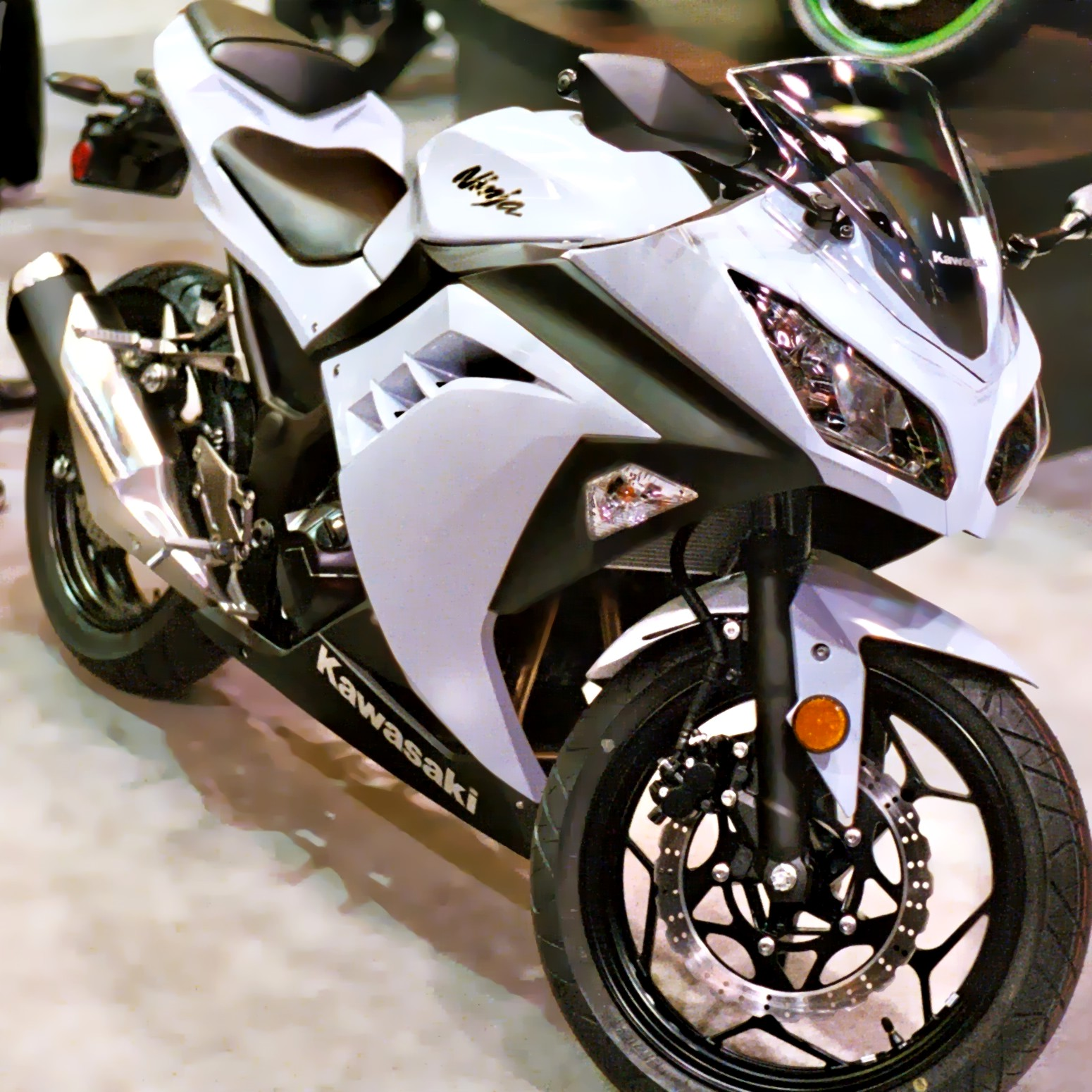
2013 Ninja 300

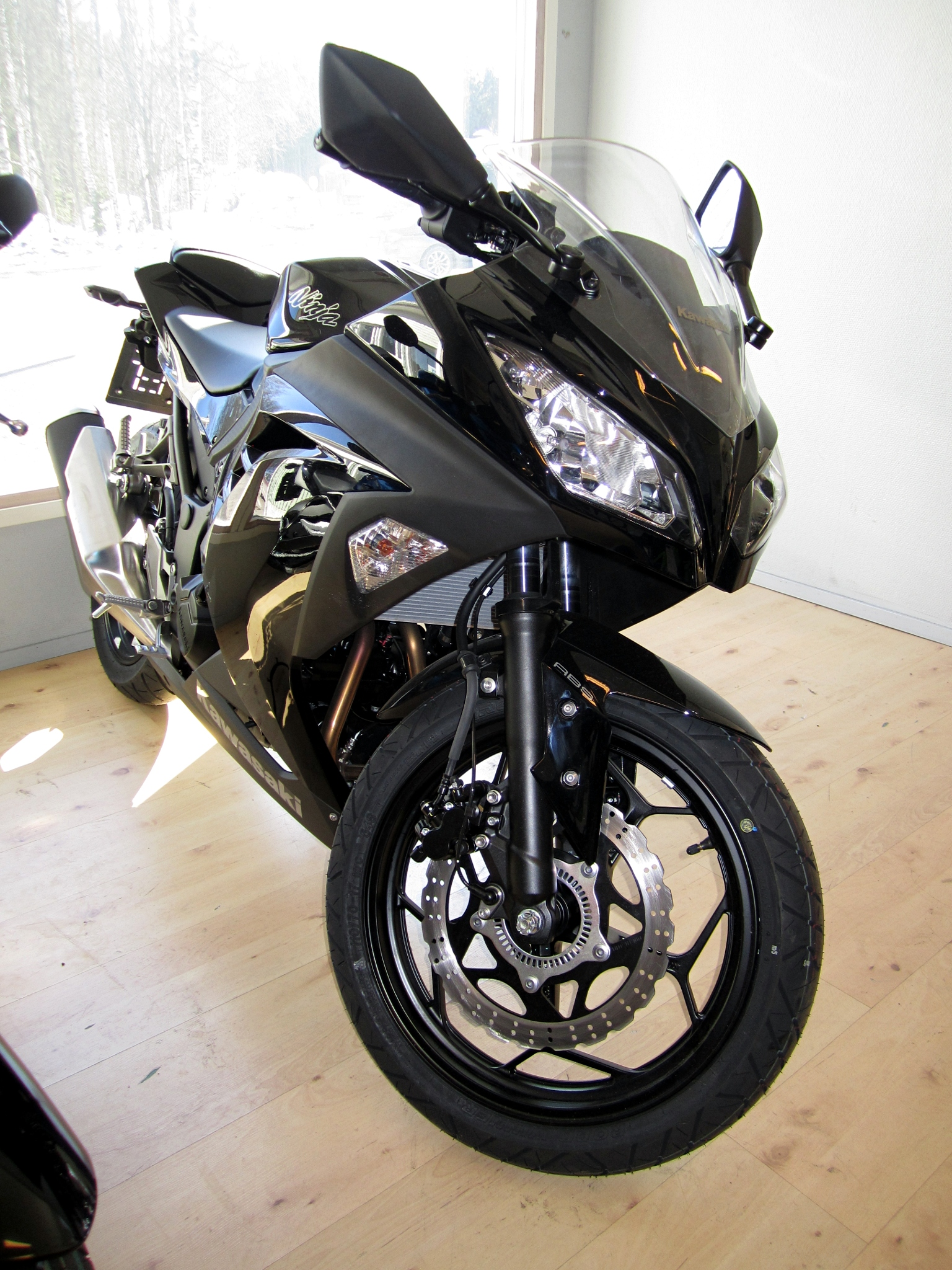

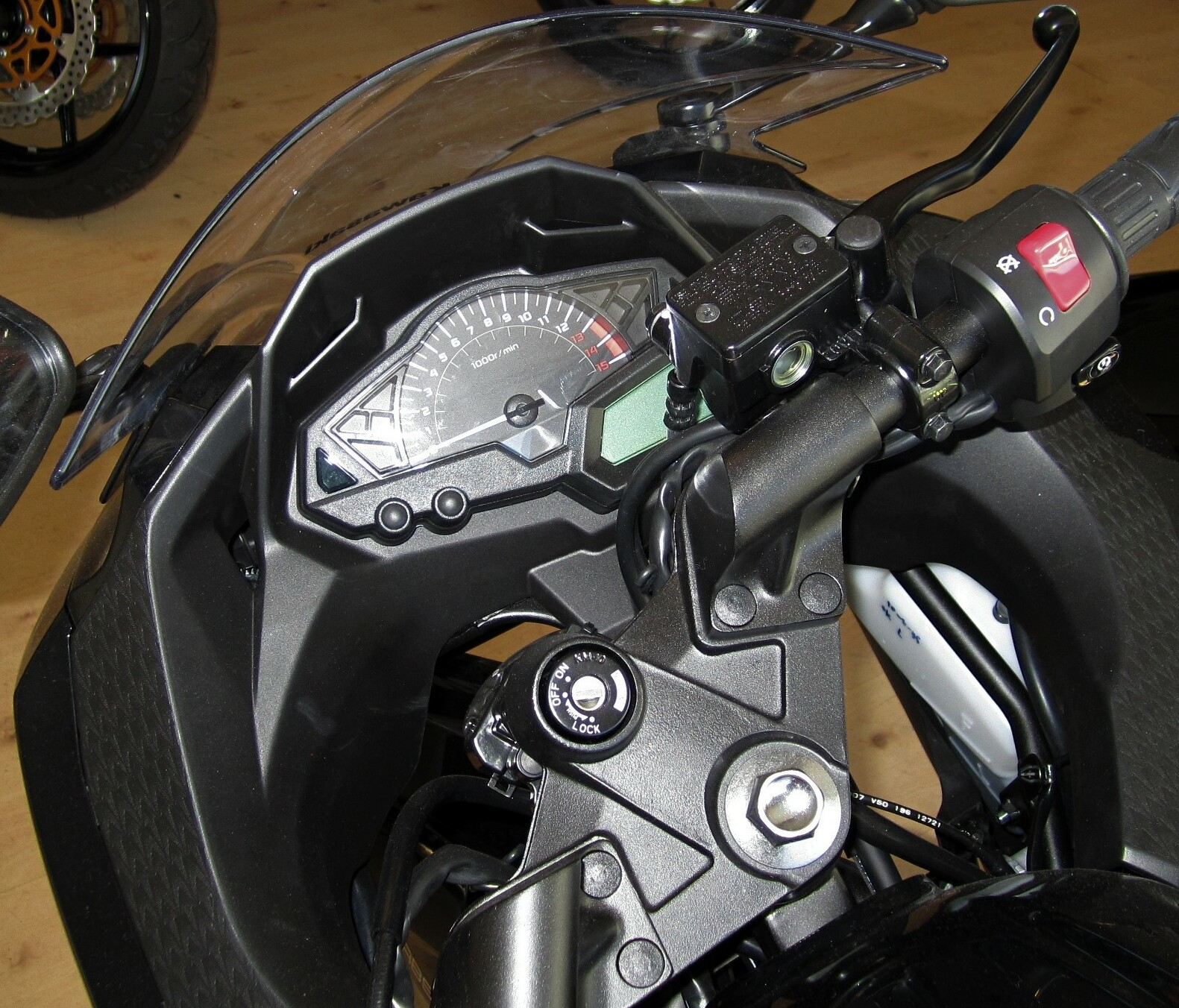
2013 Ninja

== 2022 Update ==
In 2022, the bike was released with new decals. In August 2022, it is offered at an ex-showroom price of ₹3.4 lakh (US$3,500) in India.
