= Albany Airport (Western Australia) =

Airport in Western Australia

Albany Airport Harry Riggs Albany Regional Airport

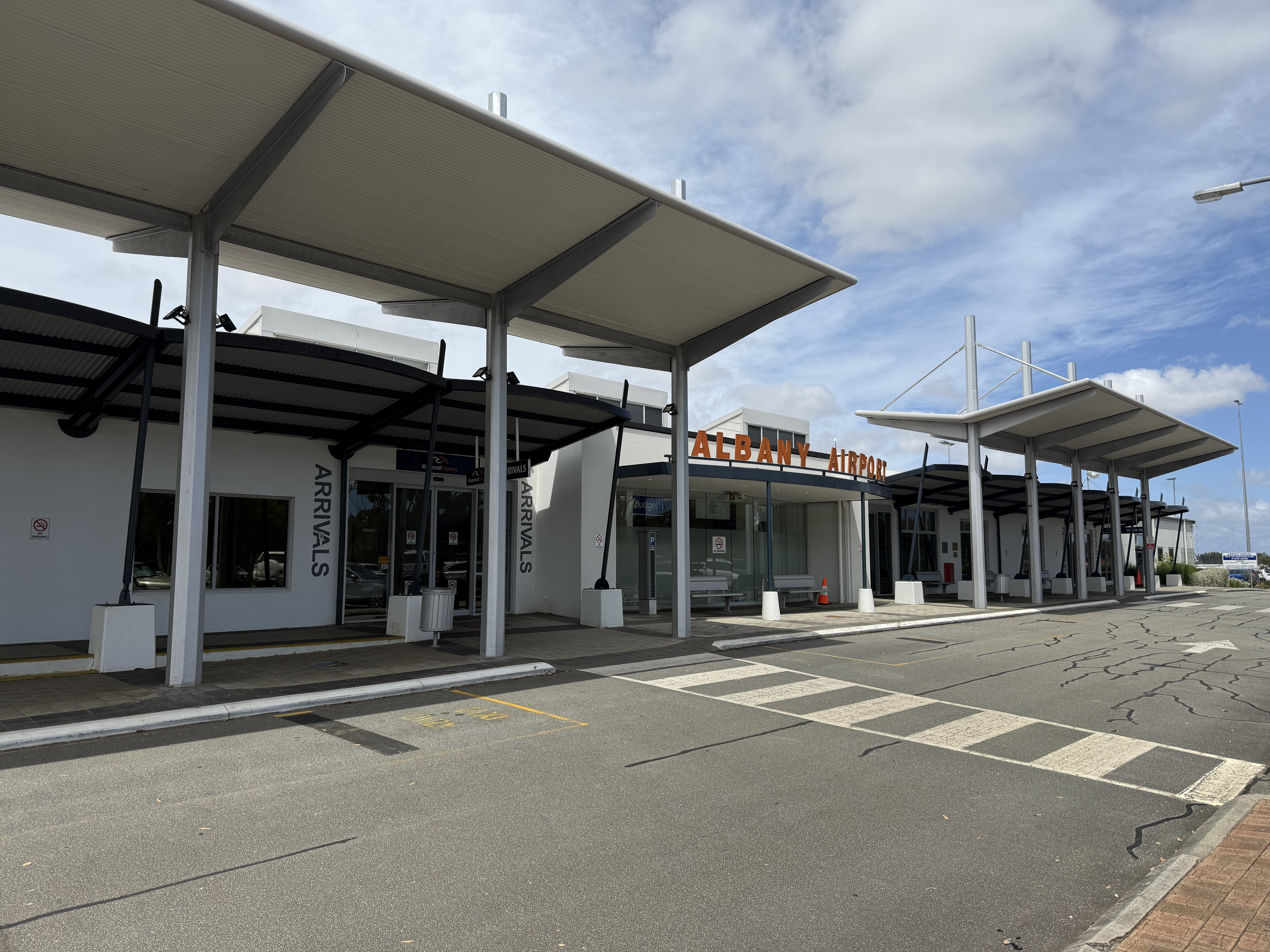
- Albany Airport terminal, 2025
- IATA: ALH; ICAO: YABA

Summary
- Airport type: Public
- Operator: City of Albany
- Serves: Albany, Western Australia
- Elevation AMSL: 233 ft / 71 m
- Coordinates: 34°56′36″S 117°48′32″E

Map
- Location in Western Australia

Runways
Direction	Length		Surface
Direction	m	ft	Surface
14/32	1,800	5,906	Asphalt
05/23	1,096	3,596	Asphalt

Statistics (2010–11)
- Passengers: 56,002
- Aircraft movements: 1,810
- Sources: Australian AIP and aerodrome chart Passenger and aircraft movements from the BITRE

Albany Airport (IATA: ALH, ICAO: YABA), also known as Harry Riggs Albany Regional Airport, is an airport serving Albany, Western Australia. It is located six nautical miles (11 km; 6.9 mi) northwest of Albany just off Albany Highway and operated by the City of Albany. It is the largest airport in the Great Southern region.

The IATA airport code is sometimes listed as ABA and the ICAO airport code was previously YPAL.

The Royal Flying Doctor Service, general charter flights and Royal Australian Air Force flights are also serviced by the airport.

== Facilities ==
The airport resides at an elevation of 233 ft (71 m) above sea level. It has two runways: 14/32 with an asphalt surface measuring 1,800 m × 30 m (5,906 ft × 98 ft) and 05/23 with an asphalt surface measuring 1,096 m × 30 m (3,596 ft × 98 ft). The sealed 1,800 m (5,906 ft) runway is capable of allowing a Boeing 737 aircraft to land.

In 2016, the airport decommissioned its instrument landing system.

In November 2017, upgrades to the airport's runway, taxiway and medical infrastructure were completed. In July 2023, the City of Albany began the process of seeking Federal Government funding for airport upgrades worth roughly $30 million.

== Airlines and destinations ==
=== Passenger ===
Airlines	Destinations
Rex Airlines	Perth

== Statistics ==
Albany Airport was ranked 57th in Australia for the number of revenue passengers served in financial year 2010–2011.

Annual passenger and aircraft statistics for Albany
Year	Revenue passengers	Aircraft movements
2001–02	32,351	1,316
2002–03	34,303	1,344
2003–04	37,462	1,334
2004–05	43,682	1,416
2005–06	49,824	1,572
2006–07	51,186	1,614
2007–08	57,401	1,817
2008–09	52,805	1,802
2009–10	52,535	1,780
2010–11	56,002	1,810

== See also ==
- List of airports in Western Australia
- Aviation transport in Australia
