= Whaling in Australia =

Commercial hunting of whales in Australia

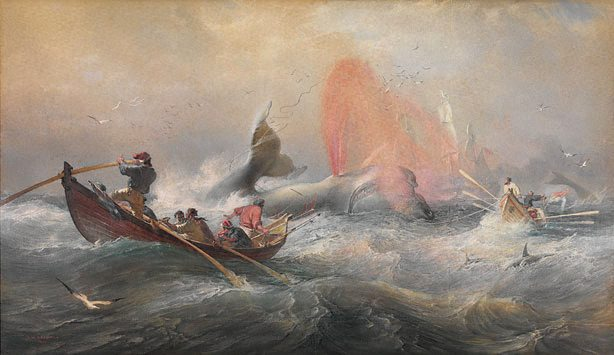
Oswald Brierly, Whalers off Twofold Bay, New South Wales, 1867

Whaling in Australian waters began in 1791 when five of the 11 ships in the Third Fleet landed their passengers and freight at Sydney Cove and then left Port Jackson to engage in whaling and seal hunting off the coast of Australia and New Zealand. The two main species hunted by such vessels in the early years were right and sperm whales. Humpback, bowhead and other whale species would later be taken.

Whaling went on to be a major maritime industry in Australia providing work for hundreds of ships and thousands of men and contributing export products worth £4.2 million by 1850.

Modern whaling using harpoon guns and iron hulled catchers was conducted in the twentieth century from shore-based stations in Western Australia, New South Wales and Queensland.

A government inquiry into the industry in 1978 resulted in a ban on whaling in Australia and a commitment to whale protection. Whale watching is now a significant tourist industry in its own right.

== Aboriginals, whales and whaling ==
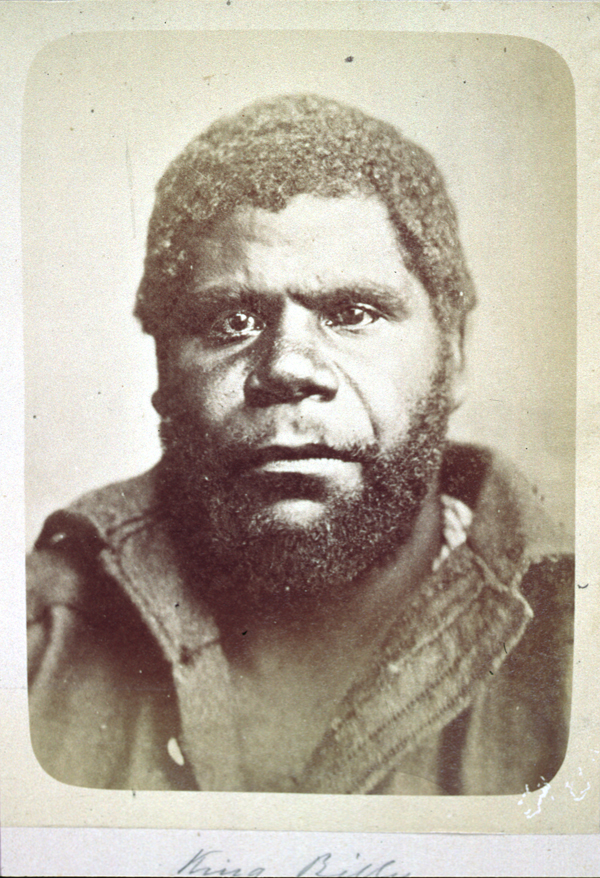
William Lanne (c1835-1869), the last "full-blood" Tasmania Aboriginal male, served on a Hobart whaler in the 1860s.

Whales played a part in the lives of coastal Aboriginals in pre-colonial Australia. They were a totem animal for some clans in Western Australia. Their depiction in rock art in New South Wales indicates whales also had significance in eastern Australia. Four or five Aboriginal rock engravings near Sydney have been identified as depicting whale feasts. Beached whales, or drift whales that died at sea and washed ashore, were an occasional food source for coastal Aboriginals. The smell of the decomposing whale would attract the first arrivals and messages would be sent to neighbouring groups to come and attend the banquet.

There is no record of any traditional hunting of whales employing the frail bark canoes or hollowed out logs used as fishing vessels. However, it has been claimed some had the ability to hunt them by other means, as in dolphin drive hunting. The Kondoli clan in South Australia were supposed to have been able to ‘’ sing'’ whales inshore in the hope they would beach themselves. According to stories recounted at the Eden Killer Whale Museum, Aboriginals at Twofold Bay in New South Wales somehow combined with killer whales to drive right whales ashore. What can be said with certainty is that the discovery of a dead whale was a major event for those living near the coast. One such group was encountered with a whale on a beach at Port Jackson on 7 September 1790.

On the 7th instant, Captain Nepean of the NSW corps, and Mr White, accompnied [sic?] by little Nanbaree and a party of men, went in a boat to Manly Cove, intending to land there and walk on to Broken Bay. On drawing near the shore, a dead whale in the most disgusting state of putrification was seen lying on the beach, and at least two hundred Indians surrounding it, broiling the flesh on different fires and feasting on it with the most extravagent marks of greediness and rapture ... on being asked the cause of their present meeting Beneelon [i.e. Bennelong] pointed to the whale, which stank immoderately, and Colbee made signals that it was common among them to eat until the stomach was so overladen as to occasion sickness.

The bones of whales were also prized for certain purposes. The ear bones were retrieved to make drinking vessels and the ribs were sometimes used as the frames for gunyahs or huts.

Europeans were aware that whales were to be found off the coast of Australia from at least 1699. That was when the British maritime explorer, naturalist and buccaneer William Dampier (1652-1715) sailed along the coast of Western Australia. There, he reported, "the sea is plentifully stocked with the largest whales that I ever saw."

Bay whaling stations established on the coast by colonists in the nineteenth century attracted tribal Aboriginals who would camp nearby and feast on the discarded whale carcasses after the blubber had been removed. Some Aboriginal men served on boats at bay whaling stations as pulling hands or manned lookout posts where their keen eye-sight allowed them to see approaching whales without the aid of a spyglass. A few served on pelagic or deep-sea whaling ships operating out of Sydney and Hobart.

== Early visiting whalers ==
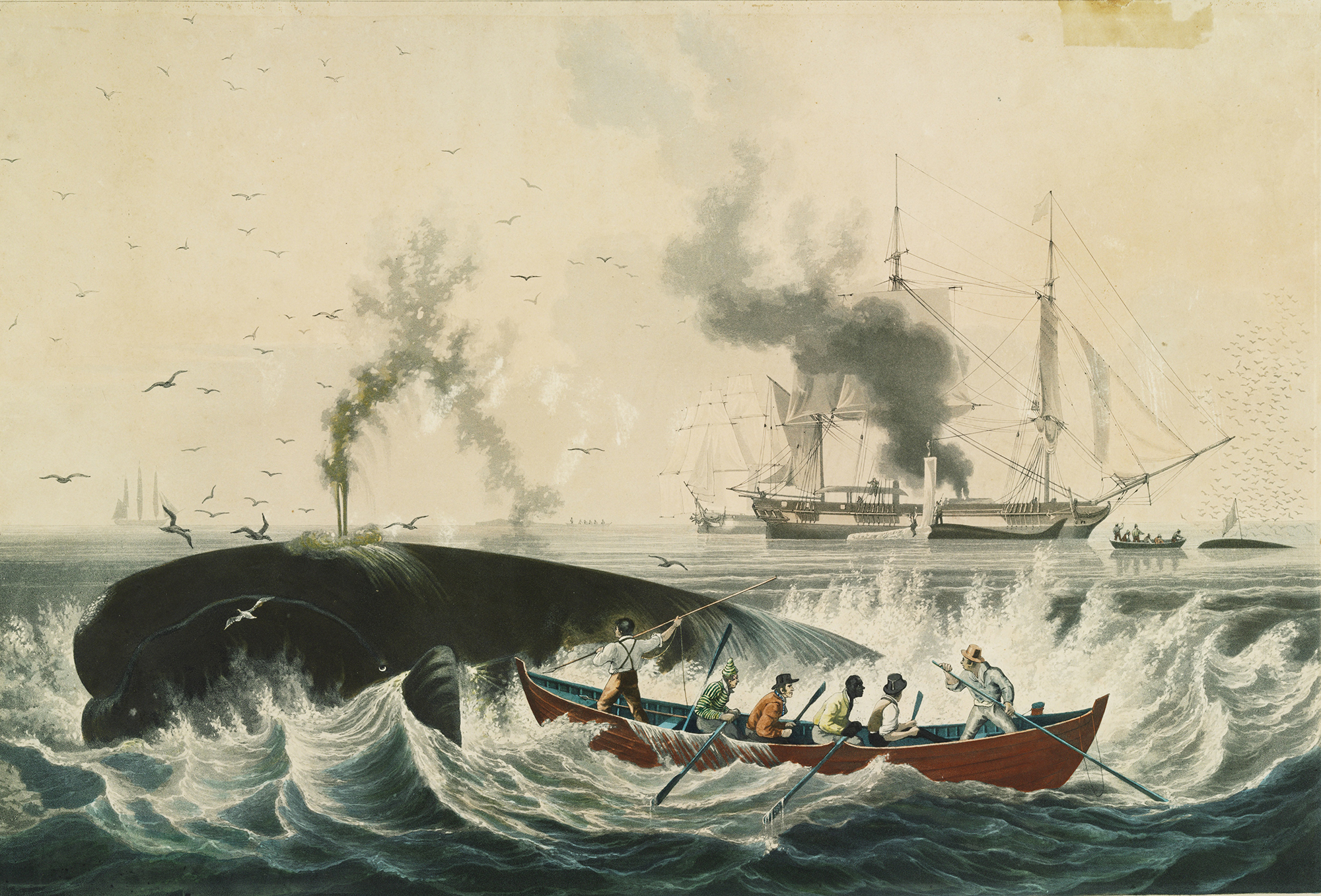
Catching and rendering whales, South Sea Whale Fishery, aquatint print, 1835

British whalers and sealers began to call at Sydney soon after European settlement began in 1788. Some came under charter as convict transports or store ships and after landing their passengers and cargo began whaling or sealing voyages from Port Jackson. The first to return to Sydney after taking whales off the coast was Captain Thomas Melvill who commanded the Britannia owned by Samuel Enderby & Sons. To mark the occasion Governor Phillip presented Captain Melvill with a cup that was later inscribed as follows,

The gift of His Excellency, Arthur Phillips [sic], Esq., Captain-General and Governor-in-Chief of His Majesty's Territory of New South Wales and its Dependencies, to Thomas Melvill, Commander of the Britannia, for killing a Spermaceti Whale on the 26th October 1791. Being the first of its kind taken on this coast since the Colony was established.

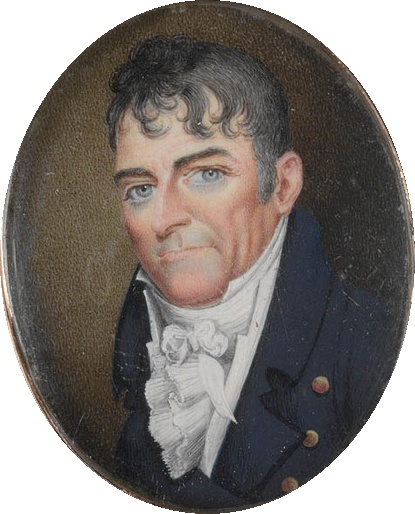
American born Captain Eber Bunker (1761-1836) commanded one of the first British vessels to whale off Australia. He later settled in New South Wales.

Hunting the sperm whale could be a lucrative activity. Britannia returned to Britain in 1793 with 118 tuns of sperm whale oil and 1,900 sealskins. The other Third Fleet whalers which returned to Britain in 1793 were William and Ann (Captain Eber Bunker) with 68 tuns of sperm whale oil and 8,468 seal skins, Mary Ann (Mark Munro) with 25 tuns of oil and 1,900 seal skins and Scamander (John Nichol) with 117 tuns of oil and 6,100 seal skins. Britannia had been at Dusky Sound on the South Island of New Zealand where some or all of the seal skins may have taken. Another Third Fleet whaler, Matilda (Matthew Weatherhead), was lost at sea. One other British whaler was reported off New Holland (Australia) between 1791 and 1793. This was Canada (Captain Alexander Muirhead) which returned to Britain in 1793 with 15 tuns of sperm whale oil, 6 tuns of right whale oil and 7,000 seal skins.

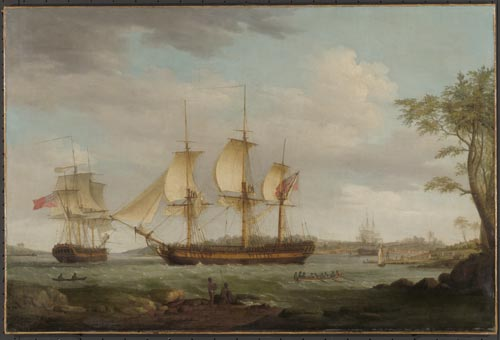
Thomas Whitcombe "Departure of the whaler Britannia from Sydney Cove, 1798", National Library of Australia, Canberra

A limitation on the industry in the early years were the Navigation Acts and Crown monopolies granting exclusive rights to all commercial maritime activity in the region by British vessels to the South Sea Company and the East India Company, or to vessels that had been licensed by these companies. Those restrictions were gradually eliminated in stages and allowed British vessels to whale, seal, go fur trading or engage in other forms of trading in the Pacific without a licence.

Taking general cargo on the outward bound voyage allowed whalers to supplement their income. The leading London whale ship owner Samuel Enderby confirmed in a letter to Sir Joseph Banks in 1801 that it was a great advantage to the owners of whalers to take freight or passengers to New South Wales. His vessel Speedy returned to London from New South Wales in 1801 with oil worth £13,600 which Enderby said was the most valuable such cargo brought back till then.

== Bay whaling ==
Bay whaling involved the capture of right whales in sheltered bays on the coast of Australia and New Zealand where they came to breed in the winter months. The industry was well suited to the limited financial resources of the early colonists. A shore-based bay whaling station could be established with little more than a few boats, try-pots and wooden casks to store the oil. The men did not usually receive a set wages but, like pelagic whalers, were paid a share of the value of the catch, known as a "lay."

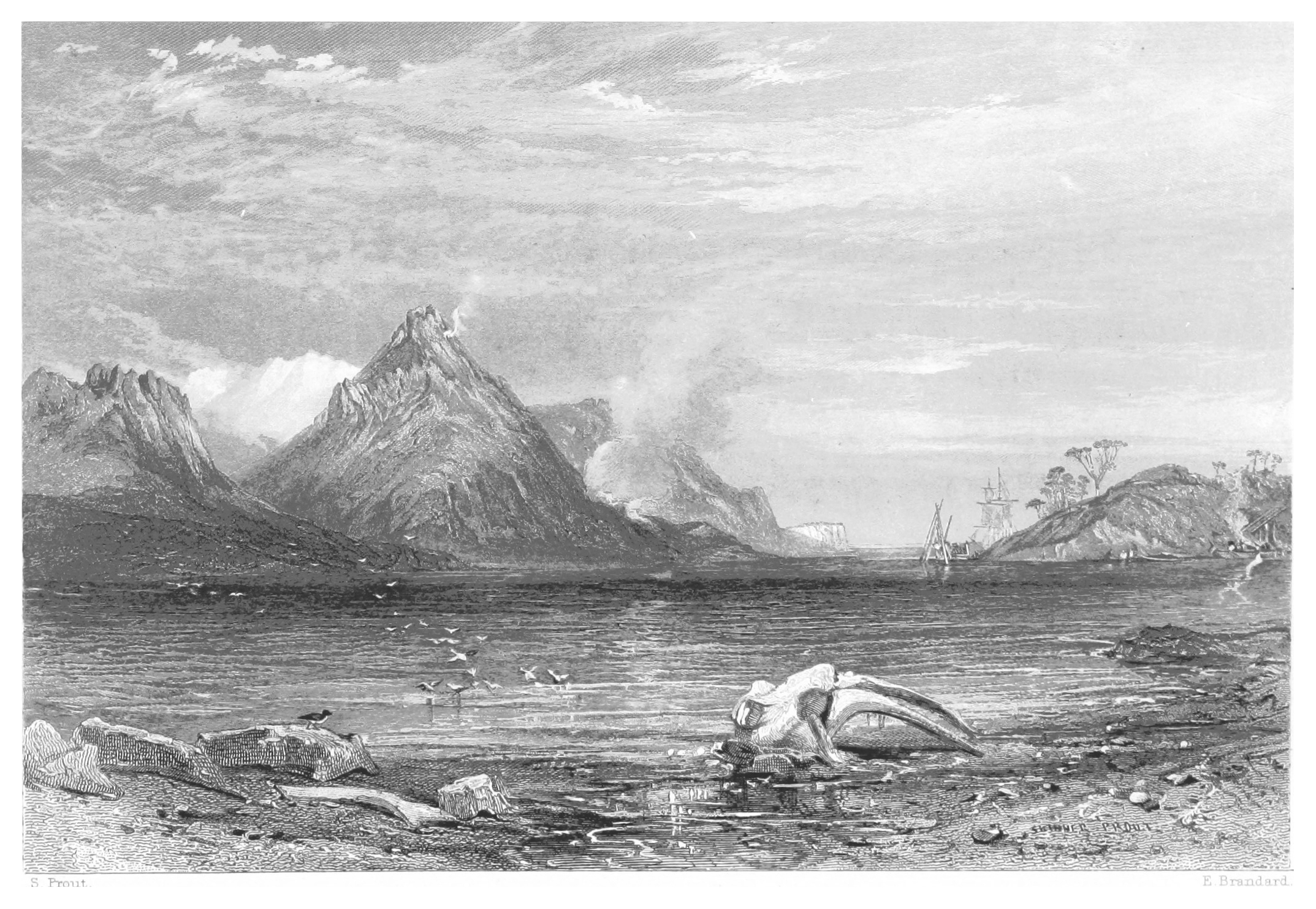
Old whaling station (1846) by John Skinner Prout. Engraved by Edwin Booth (1873)

Soon after the first colonists arrived in Tasmania in 1803, and established Hobart at the head of the Derwent Estuary, they discovered the estuary was a breeding ground for the Southern Right whale. Bay whaling activities by the colonists began in the Derwent in 1805. At least 45 whaling stations operated in Tasmania over the next four decades.

The first whaling station on the Australian mainland was established in 1828 by Captain Thomas Raine (1793-1860) at Twofold Bay, in southern New South Wales. Bay whaling was underway at Portland Bay, Victoria, by 1833, at Encounter Bay, South Australia in 1834 and at Doubtful Island Bay in Western Australia by 1836 as well as at many other locations. Australian bay whalers also went to New Zealand and were active at Cloudy Bay and Banks Peninsula (1835) on the South Island.

Teams of whalers were landed by small vessels - usually schooners - to establish temporary settlements during the winter months. These vessels usually returned for the men, and the full oil casks, at the end of the season. Some of these support vessels remained offshore, serving as a dormitory and warehouse for the operation. Pelagic (deep-sea) whaling ships occasionally came in to compete with the shore-based whalers, especially toward the end of their cruise when they were trying to fill their oil casks before returning to port. Some of these whaling stations, such as those at Portland Bay and Twofold Bay, became the forerunner of permanent settlements, the pioneer settlers combining whaling with pastoral activities.

== Australian Colonial whaling ships ==
Australian-owned whaling ships first sailed from Sydney in 1805. The 185-ton King George (Captain George Moody), owned by Henry Kable and James Underwood, departed Port Jackson in June and was "fishing" for southern right whales in the Derwent Estuary in Tasmania by July 1805. The first sperm whaler was the 224-ton Argo (Captain John Bader) owned by John Mcarthur through his London agents Hullets & Co, and which departed Sydney in September 1805. Vessels owned or based in Australia went on to make more than 1,500 whaling voyages from colonial ports in the nineteenth century. Sydney and Hobart were the two main whaling ports.

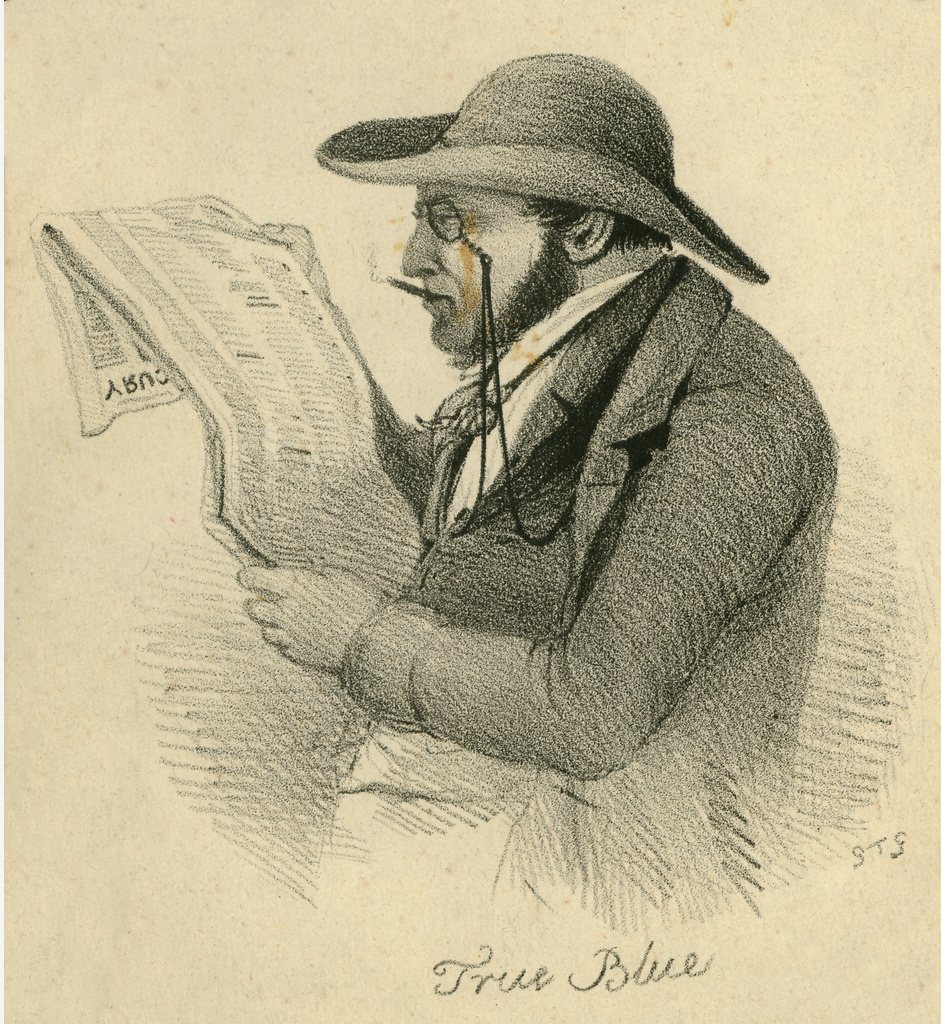
S. T. Gill, Captain John Finnis (1802-1872) commanded Sydney whaling vessels in the 1830s.

Whaling ships were sometimes hired to transport people and freight between settlements, or to establish new colonies. The Albion (362 tons) arrived at Risdon Cove on 8 September 1803, with settlers who founded Hobart. The Amity (192 tons) landed the first white settlers at Western Australia in 1826. Lord Howe Island was settled by colonists landed from the Sydney whaler Caroline (192 tons) in 1834.

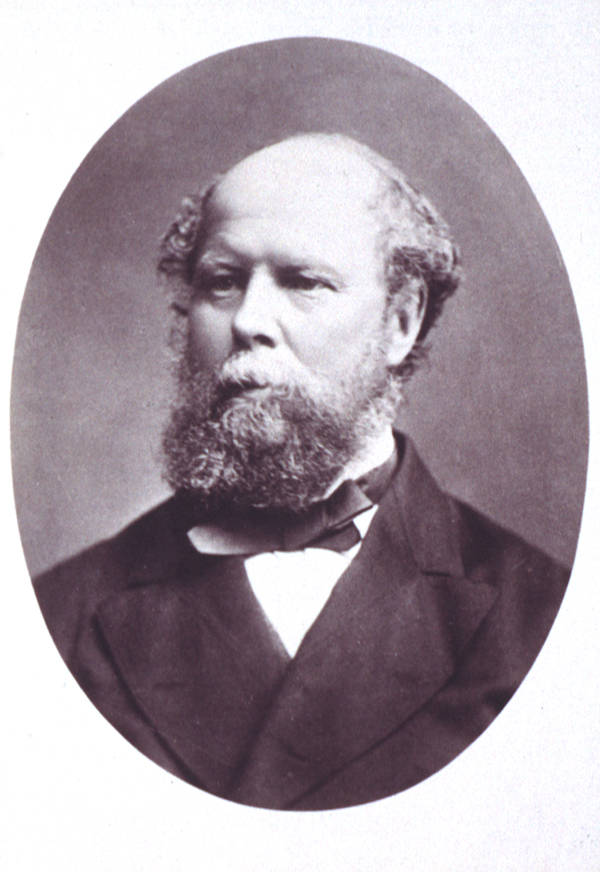
Dr William Crowther (1817-1885) was a Hobart surgeon, merchant, whaling ship owner and politician who became Premier of Tasmania.

The large crews on such vessels – necessary to man the whale boats – meant the trade was a major employer of maritime labour. The forty-two whalers based in Sydney by 1837 employed about 1,300 men. Most were British-born seamen but as the years went by Australian-born mariners joined the fleet in increasing numbers.

Whaling was a challenging business that produced capable and versatile individuals some of whom went on the achieve prominence in other fields. Three future parliamentarians and a Lord Mayor of Sydney served on Australian whalers, as did others who later became important merchants. Whaling also made a contribution to 19th century literature: Henry Kendall and Herman Melville served on Sydney whalers as young men and later wrote about the experience, Kendall as a poet and Melville in Omoo (1847) although he is better known as the author of Moby Dick (1851).

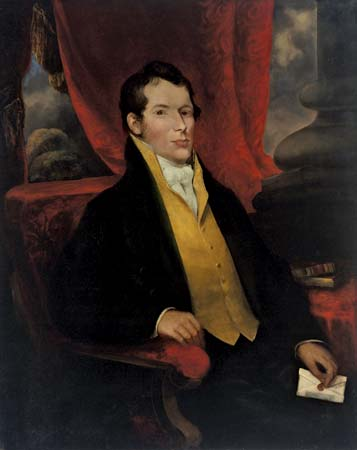
John Macarthur (1767-1834)

Many leading entrepreneurs owned whaling ships. John Macarthur, Robert Campbell, Benjamin Boyd and Robert Towns in Sydney, and Alexander McGregor, William Crowther, Askin Morrison and Alexander Imlay in Hobart were prominent entrepreneurs who diversified their business interests by owning whaling ships. Others were indirectly involved, supplying such vessels with provisions, equipment and dockside services in port.

Whale oil and baleen (whalebone) taken by bay whalers, and sperm whale oil taken by pelagic whalers, were among Australia's earliest exports. Sealing and whaling contributed more to the colonial economy than land produce until the 1830s when the fisheries were overtaken by wool production.

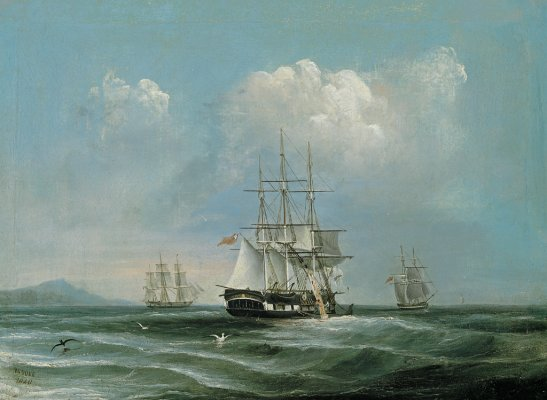
The Hobart whaling ship Pacific by William Duke, 1848. Art Gallery of South Australia.

Whaling was a significant commercial enterprise in colonial Australia, contributing export commodities worth £3.3 million between 1831 and 1845. The trade peaked in the 1830s, in terms of the number of vessels involved and the value of whaling exports, before experiencing a series of setbacks. These included a decline in productivity due to depleted whale stocks, the start of a major economic depression in 1840, a series of gold rushes on mainland Australia starting in 1851, the discovery that mineral oil could be made into petroleum the use of which superseded whale oil as a lamp fuel and a realisation that a better and more reliable return could be obtained from investment in fine wool production. The last colonial whaler to sail was the Helen which left Hobart on 17 March 1898.

== Modern whaling ==
Modern whaling using steam-powered vessels and bow-mounted harpoon guns with explosive heads developed in the second half of the nineteenth century and allowed larger and faster swimming species to be hunted. The later introduction of factory ships with a stern ramp enabled captured whales to be dragged onto the deck and processed with greater speed and safety. Norway was the leading whaling nation by the end of the nineteenth century and the introduction of modern whaling in Australia, as elsewhere, was associated with Norwegian entrepreneurs, ships and mariners.

Norwegian businessman Henrik Johan Bull was living in Australia in the 1890s when he conceived the idea of using Melbourne as a base to whale in the Antarctic. Unable to interest local investors, he returned to Norway and approached Svend Foyn (1809-1894) generally regarded as the founder of modern whaling. The sealing vessel Cap Nor (346 tons) was purchased and her auxiliary engine was upgraded and she was fitted out for whaling. Renamed Antarctic, the vessel left Norway on 20 September 1893 and after sealing at Kerguelen Island en route arrived at Melbourne on 24 February 1894. Antarctic left Melbourne in April 1894 and briefly cruised off Tasmania before heading for the Auckland Islands and Campbell Island, returning to Melbourne five months later.

Norwegian firms established shore-based whaling stations in Western Australia at Frenchman’s Bay near Albany in 1912 and at Point Cloates in 1913. The Australian Whaling Commission established another whaling station in Western Australia in 1949 at Carnarvon.

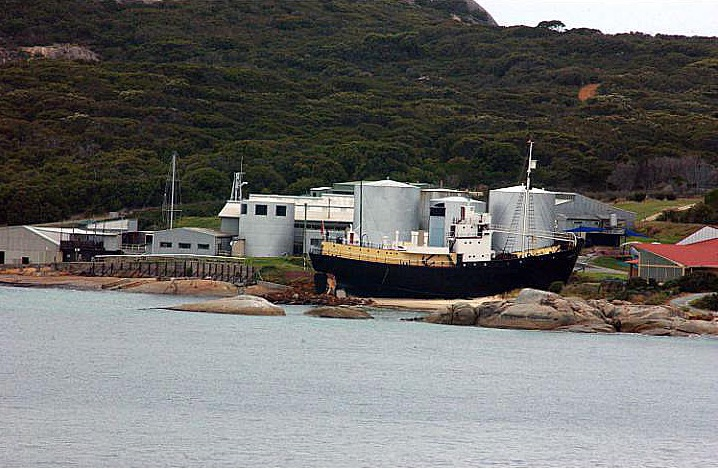
The Cheyne Beach whaling station (2013), Western Australia, now functions as a tourist attraction.

Norwegian factory ships and catchers sailing to and from the Antarctic would call at Hobart for provisions, men and repairs. They also tried whaling off the coast of Tasmania. A factory ship reached Tasmania in January 1912 and took 1,599 barrels of oil off the coast. Another factory ship took just 480 barrels of oil off the coast of Australia but found a single piece of ambergris that weighed 1,003 lbs, the largest ever recorded till that time, which sold in London for £23,000.

By 1956 there were six whaling stations operating in Australia. Three were in Western Australia, at Frenchman’s Bay, Point Cloates and Carnarvon. One was located at Tangalooma in Queensland and another at Byron Bay in New South Wales. The sixth was on Norfolk Island. Overfishing caused the collapse of the humpback population by 1962 and a shift in focus to sperm whales.

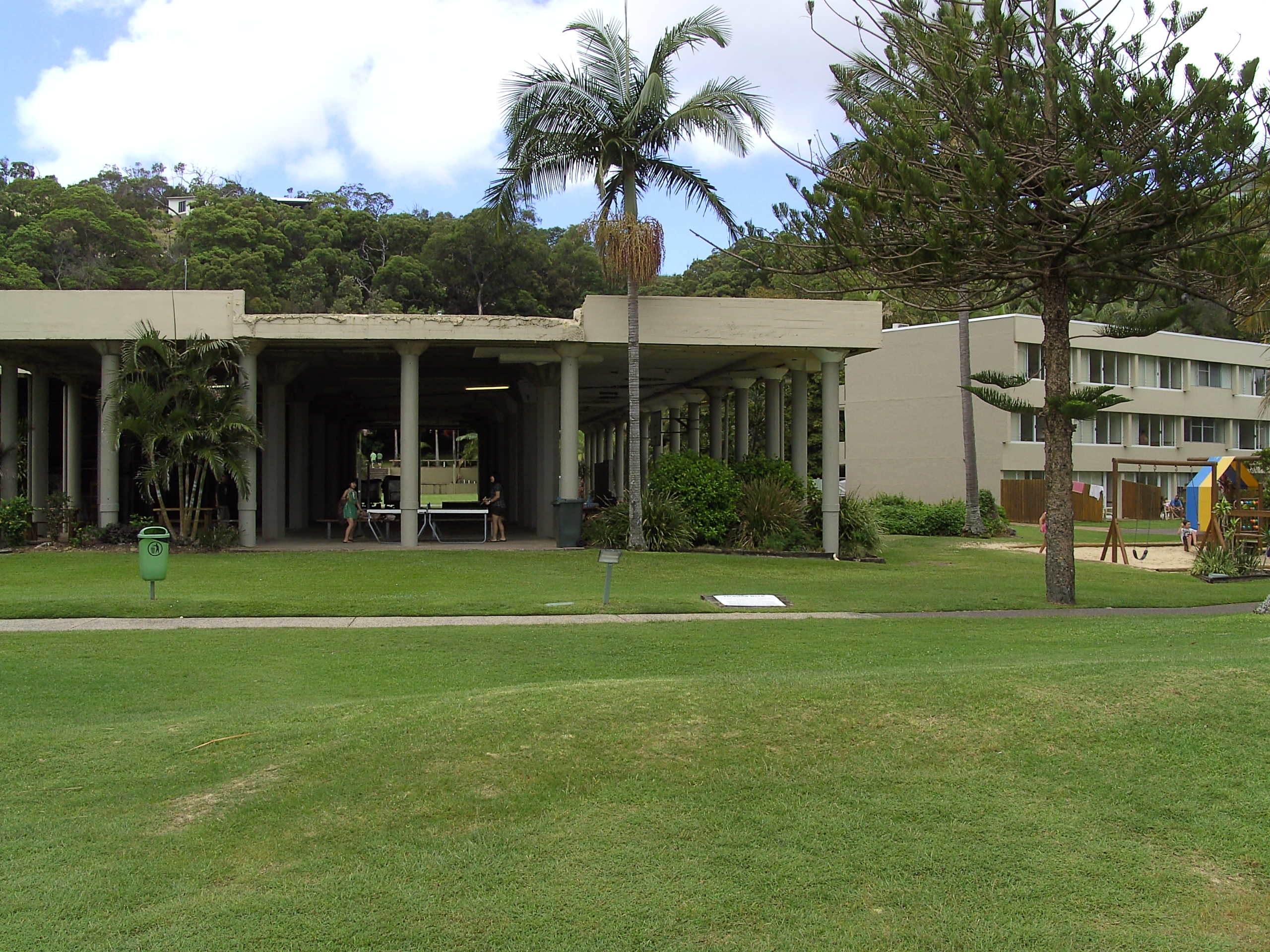
Remains of Tangalooma's concrete flensing deck in 2010

Overfishing also saw the closure of some whaling stations before the government ban on the industry was introduced. The whaling station at Tangalooma, Queensland, on Moreton Island alone harvested and processed 6277 humpback whales between 1952 and 1962 and contributed to the crash in the eastern Australian humpback population and forced the closure of the Tangalooma, Byron Bay and Norfolk Island whaling stations in 1962.

There are a number of heritage institutions connected with the whaling industry in Australia. These include the Eden Killer Whale Museum in southern New South Wales and the Cheyne Beach Whaling Station (now known as Albany's Historic Whaling Station) in Western Australia. The largest collection of Australian whaling ship log books is held by the W L Crowther Collection in the State Library of Tasmania.

== The abolition of whaling in Australia ==
In 1978 the federal government appointed Sir Sydney Frost, a former chief justice of Papua New Guinea, to conduct an inquiry into whales and whaling. This followed a direct pro-whale action campaign in Albany, Western Australia, and a national community campaign by groups including Project Jonah, Friends of the Earth and the Whale and Dolphin Coalition.

Greenpeace co-founder Canadian Bob Hunter came to Albany in August 1977 to take charge of a direct action campaign against the three whale chaser ships operating from Albany. Zodiacs were taken 30 miles out to sea to place people between harpoons and the whales. This was the first Greenpeace campaign in Australia. Key members of the Whale and Dolphin Coalition, including Jonny Lewis and Richard Jones, then formed Greenpeace Australia.

On 31 July 1978, the first day of the Frost inquiry public hearings, the Cheynes Beach Whaling Company announced its intention to close operations at the end of that whaling season. Cheynes Beach had operated from Frenchman Bay near Albany, Western Australia, since 1952. The last whale, a sperm whale, was harpooned on 20 November 1978.

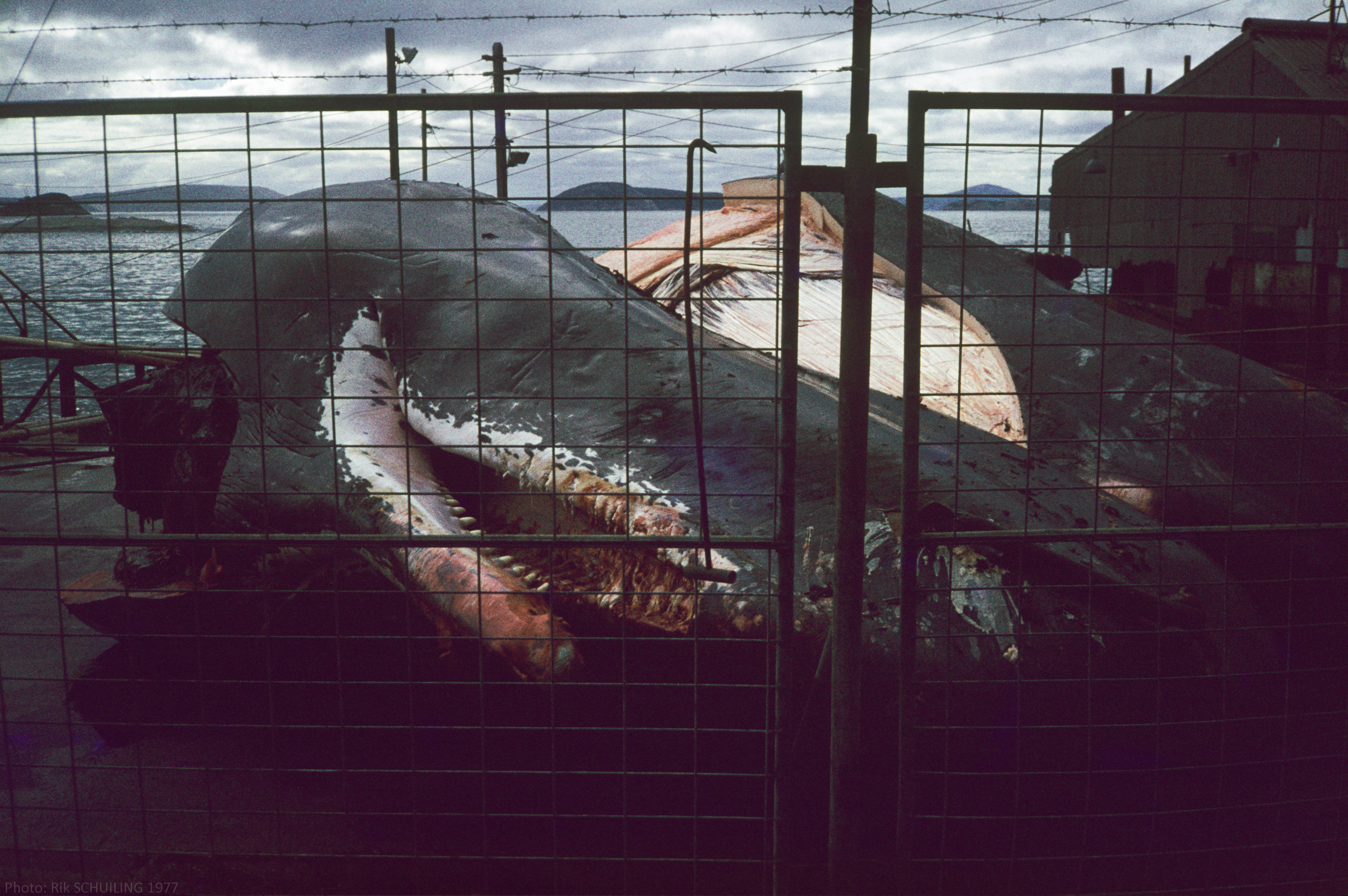
Sperm whale remains at the Albany Whaling Station in July 1977

Frost's report, Whales and Whaling: Report of the Independent Inquiry, recommended banning whaling in Australia, with its recommendations endorsed by the Fraser government in April 1979. In June 1979, environment minister James Webster announced that responsibility for whaling would be moved from the Department of Primary Industry to the Department of Science and the Environment. The following month Webster announced that the government would seek to end illegal "pirate" whaling and was "firmly committed to a policy of vigorous and active protection of whales". In the same year Australia and Seychelles successfully lobbied the International Whaling Commission (IWC) to introduce the Indian Ocean Whale Sanctuary.

The Whale Protection Act 1980 formally banned commercial whaling in Australian waters and made it illegal to kill, injure or interfere with a whale unless authorised by the government for scientific purposes. The 1980 legislation was succeeded by the Environment Protection and Biodiversity Conservation Act 1999.

Australia is now a global anti-whaling advocate and has taken a strong stance against Japan's whaling program in the Antarctic Ocean. The State Library of New South Wales holds an extensive collection of material related to whaling in its collection including art works, photographs, whalers diaries, whale bone and scrimshaw.

The return of southern right whales to the Derwent River and other parts of Australia in recent decades is a sign that they are slowly recovering from their earlier exploitation to near extinction.

Anecdotal evidence suggests that whale populations, especially humpbacks, have been steadily increasing since the end of whaling in Australian waters. The sperm whale population off Western Australia shows little sign of recovery. Whale watching is an increasingly popular activity in the region.

== Long serving or notable Australian colonial whaling vessels ==
- Aladdin (1847-1885)
- Australian 264 tons (1829-1856)
- Caernarvon (1834-1867)
- Clarkstone (1829-1852)
- Emily Downing (1857-1885)
- Flying Childers (1846-1877)
- Grecian (1843-1864)
- Highlander (1837-1862)
- King George 185 tons (1805-1815) The first Australian whaler. Also the first to be built in Australia.
- Lady Blackwood, (1830-1859)
- Louisa, (1856-1879)
- Lucy Ann, 213 tons (1833-1852) Herman Melville served aboard in 1842.
- Marie Laure (1849-1886)
- Offley (1849-1880) Probably Hobart’s longest lived whaler. Built in 1849 and still in existence in 1952.
- Pocklington (1825-1851)
- Prince of Denmark (1834-1863)
- Proteus, 254 tons (1831-1852). Probably Sydney’s longest lived whaler. Built in Java in 1815 and not broken up till 1918.
- Runnymede (1849-1881)
- Sapphire (1855-1888)
- Tigress (1829-1851)
- Venus 288 tons (1831-1835) In 1831 ventured to latitude 72 degrees south and within the Antarctic Circle.
- Waterwitch 243 tons (1860-1895)
- Woodlark 238 tons (1820-1854)

== In literature ==
Novels and poems about Australian whaling include, Herman Melville, Omoo (1847); Ernest Wells, Hemp (1933); two by Will Lawson, Harpoons Ahoy (1938), and, In Ben Boyd’s Day (1939); Tim Winton, Shallows (1984); Francis Webb, A Drum for Ben Boyd (1948); Iris Nesdale, The Bay Whalers (1985); Bryce Courtenay, Tommo and Hawk (1997); Jeane Upjohn, The Young Whalers (2002); Fiona Kidman, The Captive Wife (2005); Nerida Newton, Death of a Whaler (2006), Shirley Barrett, Rush Oh! (2015), Mr Carver’s Whale (2022), by Lyn Hughes.

== See also ==
- Economic history of Australia
- Eden Killer Whale Museum
- International Whaling Commission
- Whale watching in Australia
- Whaling in Western Australia
- Cheyne Beach Whaling Station
- Benjamin Boyd
- Eber Bunker
- Robert Towns
- Whaling in the United Kingdom
- Category:Australian people in whaling, a list of captains, shipowners and others in the industry
- Category:Whaling stations in Australia, places on the coast where shore-based whaling took place
