= Whaling in Western Australia =

Defunct industry

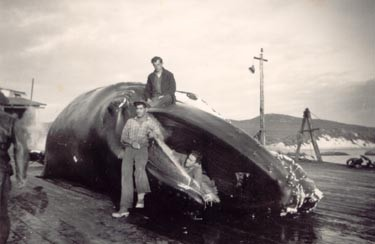
A whale being processed at Cheynes Beach Whaling Station in the early 1950s

Whaling was one of the first viable industries established in the Swan River Colony following the 1829 arrival of British settlers to Western Australia. The industry had numerous ups and downs until the last whaling station closed in Albany in 1978.

There are two main species of whales (order Cetacea) which form aggregations along the Western Australian coastline: the southern right whale (Eubalaena australis), and the humpback whale (Megaptera novaeangliae). The southern rights are slow swimmers and their carcasses tend to float due to the high concentration of oil in the blubber – hence the name "right" as it made the task of the whale chasers easier. Its conservation status is now listed as endangered as a result of more than 150 years of hunting. Both species migrated along the north–south coastline, stopping in bays such as Geographe Bay (east of Cape Naturaliste) and Flinders Bay (east of Cape Leeuwin) for mating and breeding. Other species occasionally caught were sperm whales and blue whales, although these tended to be seen mainly along the southern coast of Western Australia.

== Early days ==
Yankee whalers were known to have been operating in the Indian Ocean since 1789 and had been inside King George Sound before the end of 1828. A stone structure known as Sealers' Oven dating to around 1800 near Albany is further evidence of this.

Albany merchant Thomas Booker Sherratt was operating a bay whaling station at Doubtful Island Bay, 160 kilometres (99 mi) north-east of Albany, by 1836. George Cheyne also operated a whaling station in the area around the same time.

By 1837, two local whaling companies were operating: the Fremantle Whaling Company out of Bather's Beach below the Round House gaol in Fremantle, and the Perth Whaling Company, which was based on Carnac Island. The first whale was caught by the combined efforts of the two companies on 10 June 1837. An account of the incident is given by George Fletcher Moore in his book Diary of Ten Years Eventful Life of an Early Settler in Western Australia:

This day will be memorable in the annals of the Colony for the killing of the first whale. At Perth, great firing was heard in the direction of Fremantle and it was supposed that a ship had arrived, but a messenger came in breathless haste to say that boats had struck a whale and were engaged with it. This was all that was known when I came away but everyone was running about elated with the news; I went to Fremantle on Thursday with the Governor and others, to examine a jetty and proposed tunnel which has been projected to be cut through a hill there giving easy access from the beach to the main street. The plan is quite practicable and not very expensive for the distance is only eighty yards and the rock is soft limestone.

The Fremantle Whaling Company had been established in February of that year. A few weeks after the whale was caught, permission was given for the tunnel's construction using prisoners for the labour. The tunnel provided direct access to the Town of Fremantle for the sale of whale goods to the community. In 1837, the first year of operations, whaling had generated export revenue of £3,000, equivalent to A$395,500 in 2022, from 100 tonnes (220,000 pounds) of oil and 5.1 tonnes (11,000 pounds) of whalebone. The next largest export commodity was wool which earned £1,784.

In the first years of the colony, large numbers of the Yankee whalers, as well as French vessels, frequently operated close inshore including inside Cockburn Sound, causing conflicts with Western Australian-based whale chasers. There were numerous incidents of close quarter conflicts between the various companies. Governor James Stirling was lobbied to remove the foreign vessels. The American whalers were believed to have earned £30,000 from catches along the Western Australian coastline in 1837. It is estimated that in 1845 there were approximately 300 American, French, British and Australian whaling ships operating off the south coast of Australia with numerous shore stations. Legislation was passed in 1860 prohibiting unlicensed whalers from operating in Western Australian waters. However, few foreign vessels heeded the supposed restriction. At about the same time though, petroleum oil was discovered in Pennsylvania, which caused whale oil prices to crash.

By 1840, increased competition and a decline in international whale oil and bone prices and increased costs led to the two local companies' closures. Some whale boats were used for ferry services on the Swan River. An improvement in commodity prices in 1843 saw operations recommence, and in 1844 whaling products comprised nearly 40% of the total value of the state's exports.

The first British pelagic whaler reported off the coast of Western Australia was Arabian captained by Thomas Collins in 1842.

The town of Dunsborough in Geographe Bay evolved from the establishment of the Castle Rock Whaling Station in 1845. During the convict era of Western Australia, many of the ships which brought convicts to the state were whalers, and would revert to their whaling operations for the return voyage.

Throughout the 19th century, descendants of Robert and Ann Heppingstone, who had arrived in the colony aboard Warrior in 1830, were prominent in the industry. Members of the family operated whalers in and around Fremantle. A granddaughter, Ellen Heppingstone, married Alf Bussell and settled in Augusta at Flinders Bay. Flinders Bay, also known to some locals as "The Whaling", became an important whaling centre during the period.

Major work on the history and archaeology of the early whaling industry in Western Australia, as well as relations between colonists and American pelagic whalers, and between both groups and coastal Aboriginal peoples, has been undertaken by Martin Gibbs of the University of Sydney.

A whale bone collected as an artefact at an Aboriginal camp near Kalgoorlie in 1897, transported hundreds of kilometres from any coastline, was a vertebra of a young whale that was probably obtained at Esperance and perhaps employed as a carrying dish or culturally valued object.

== 20th century ==
The Western Australian Government granted a licence to a Norwegian company in 1912 to operate whaling stations at Frenchman Bay near Albany and Point Cloates (then known as Norwegian Bay) off North West Cape. The company traded profitably for a number of years by making use of the recently invented exploding harpoon and gun on steam powered chaser boats, rather than the old toggling harpoons. Approximately 4,000 whales were caught in that period.

A poor whaling season in 1916 amid pressures brought on by World War I, forced the company to close down.

In the early 1930s, the station at Point Cloates began servicing Norwegian whaling ships again, but again, closure was brought on by the start of World War II. Expanded use of factory ships and support chasers also lessened the need for shore based services.

After the war, in July 1949, the Nor'-West Whaling Company reopened the station.

In September 1950, the Australian Government commenced whaling itself as the Australian Whaling Commission in a whaling station at Babbage Island near Carnarvon. The operation ran until 1955, when the station was sold to Nor'-West Whaling Company, which closed down its Point Cloates station and relocated to the Carnarvon site. Nor'-West was later renamed as 'Nor-West Seafoods' and converted the whaling station into a factory for processing prawns. The company continues today as a prawn processor as well as operating seasonal whale and dolphin watching tours.

The Albany Whaling Company operated at Frenchman's Bay east of Albany from 1947 until 1950. It took only six humpback whales.

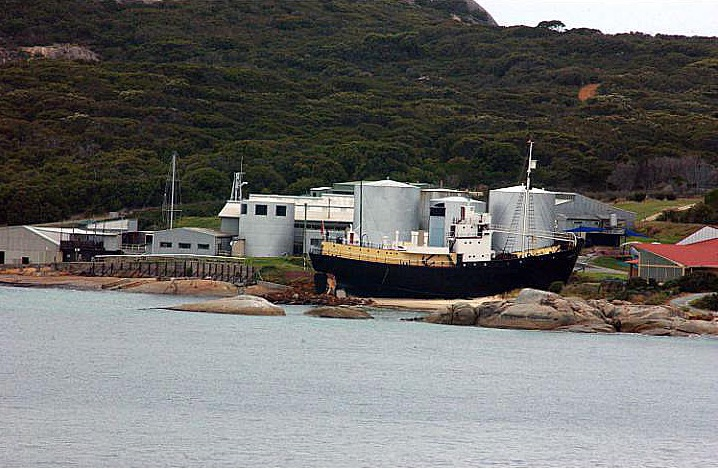
Cheynes Beach Whaling Station

The Cheynes Beach Whaling Company started at Frenchman Bay in 1952. Initially the station was granted a quota of only 50 humpbacks, but this was increased and at its peak, the company took between 900 and 1100 sperm and humpback whales each year for processing. However, there was a ban on humpback whaling from 1963 which decreased the viability of the catch.

Cheynes Beach struggled commercially for several years prior to its closure in 1978 because of increased fuel costs and uncertain buyers in Europe. The uncertainty of not being able to sell a product finally brought an end to the industry which had been an important contributor to the economy for 140 years and the last whale, a female sperm whale, was taken on 20 November 1978. The final season's catch had 698 sperm whales, 15 short of its quota set by the International Whaling Commission. It was the last whaling station in Australia.

Cheynes Beach Whaling Station is now known as Albany's Historic Whaling Station, a popular tourist destination. Whale watching from Albany centres on humpback whales close to shore. Sperm whales are rarely seen as their migratory path takes them on a course parallel to the coast line and along the continental shelf.

== See also ==
- The Last Whale
- Whaling in Australia
- Thar She Blows!

== General references ==
- Suter, Keith D. (October 1982). "Australia's new whaling policy: formulation and implementation". Marine Policy. 6 (4): 287–302. Bibcode:1982MarPo...6..287S. doi:10.1016/0308-597X(82)90004-5.
- Max Egan (1995). "Australian Whaling History".
- Heppingstone, I.D. (1966). "Bay whaling in Western Australia". Early Days. 6 (5): 29–41. Archived from the original on 30 January 2016.
- A bibliography of Whaling in Australia (PDF) (Report). Archived from the original (PDF) on 5 September 2008.
- Pash, Chris (2008). The Last Whale (Fremantle Press) ISBN 978-1-921361-32-6. Fremantle Press. ISBN 9781921361326.
