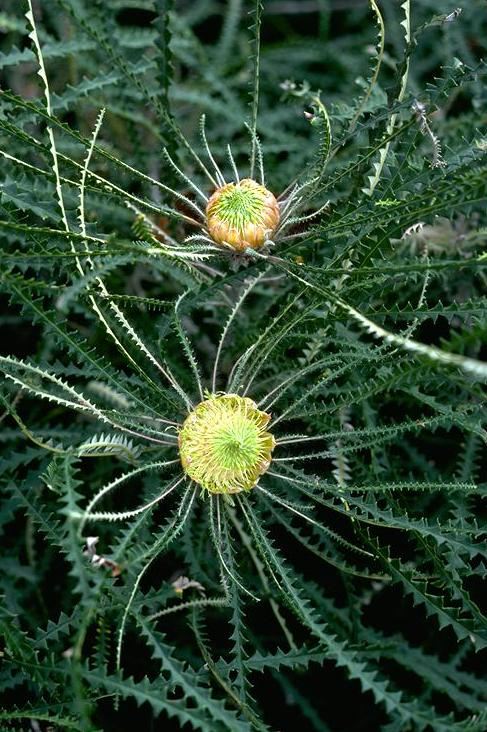

Conservation status
- Vulnerable (IUCN 3.1)

Scientific classification
- Kingdom: Plantae
- Clade: Tracheophytes
- Clade: Angiosperms
- Clade: Eudicots
- Order: Proteales
- Family: Proteaceae
- Genus: Banksia
- Subgenus: Banksia subg. Banksia
- Series: Banksia ser. Dryandra
- Species: B. mucronulata

Binomial name
- Banksia mucronulata (R.Br.) A.R.Mast & K.R.Thiele

Subspecies
- Banksia mucronulata subsp. mucronulata

Synonyms
- Banksia mucronulata (R.Br.) A.R.Mast & K.R.Thiele subsp. mucronulata; Banksia mucronulata subsp. retrorsa (A.S.George) A.R.Mast & K.R.Thiele; Dryandra mucronulata R.Br.; Josephia mucronulata (R.Br.) Kuntze isonym

= Banksia mucronulata =

Swordfish dryandra

Species of shrub in Western Australia

Banksia mucronulata, commonly known as swordfish dryandra, is a species of shrub that is endemic to Western Australia. It has spreading, hairy stems, linear, deeply pinnatifid leaves with sharply-pointed lobes, pale yellow to cream-coloured flowers in heads of between 80 and 180, and egg-shaped follicles.

== Description ==
Banksia mucronulata is a shrub that typically grows to a height of 0.5–2.5 m (1 ft 8 in – 8 ft 2 in) but does not form a lignotuber. It has hairy, spreading stems and linear, deeply pinnatifid leaves that are 150–250 mm (5.9–9.8 in) long and 4–12 mm (0.16–0.47 in) wide with short, woolly hairs on the lower surface. There are between forty and sixty sharply-pointed lobes on each side. The flowers are pale yellow or cream-coloured and arranged in head of between 80 and 180 short side branch and surrounded by tangled, woolly hairs. There are hairy oblong involucral bracts 20–25 mm (0.79–0.98 in) long at the base of the head. The perianth is 18–30 mm (0.71–1.18 in) long and the pistil 23–30 mm (0.91–1.18 in) long and curved. Flowering occurs from May to July and the follicles are egg-shaped, 14–20 mm (0.55–0.79 in) long and hairy.

== Taxonomy and naming ==
This species was first formally described in 1810 by Robert Brown who gave it the name Dryandra mucronulata and published the description in Transactions of the Linnean Society of London. The specific epithet (mucronulata) is a latinization of mucronulate, referring to the small point on the tip of the leaf lobes.

In 2007 Austin Mast and Kevin Thiele transferred all dryandras to the genus Banksia and renamed this species Banksia mucronulata.

== Distribution and habitat ==
Banksia mucronulata grows in kwongan, shrubland and wandoo woodland between Cranbrook and Cheyne Beach, including in the Stirling Range.

== Conservation status ==
This banksia is classified as not threatened by the Western Australian Government Department of Parks and Wildlife.
