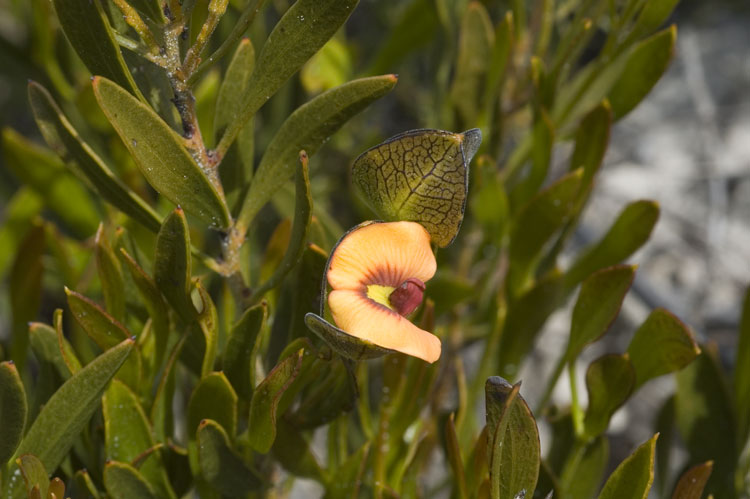
- Near Ravensthorpe

Scientific classification
- Kingdom: Plantae
- Clade: Tracheophytes
- Clade: Angiosperms
- Clade: Eudicots
- Clade: Rosids
- Order: Fabales
- Family: Fabaceae
- Subfamily: Faboideae
- Genus: Daviesia
- Species: D. alternifolia

Binomial name
- Daviesia alternifolia F.Muell.

Synonyms
- Daviesia alternifolia var. ternata (Endl.) E.Pritz.; Daviesia ternata Endl.

= Daviesia alternifolia =

Species of flowering plant

Daviesia alternifolia is a species of flowering plant in the family Fabaceae and is endemic to the south-west of Western Australia. It is a dense, spreading shrub with scattered, egg-shaped phyllodes with the narrower end towards the base, and orange and red flowers with a greenish-yellow centre.

== Description ==
Daviesia alternifolia is a dense, spreading shrub that typically grows to a height of 35 cm (14 in) and has foliage covered with tiny hairs. The phyllodes are scattered along the branchlets, egg-shaped with the narrower end towards the base, 25–50 mm (0.98–1.97 in) long and 4–13 mm (0.16–0.51 in) wide with a pointed tip. The flowers are arranged in pairs or threes on a peduncle 10–50 mm (0.39–1.97 in) long, each flower on a pedicel 2–3 mm (0.079–0.118 in) long. The five sepals are 6–7 mm (0.24–0.28 in) long and joined at the base, the two upper lobes joined in a broad "lip" and the lower three triangular. The standard petal is orange with red markings and a greenish-yellow centre and 10–12 mm (0.39–0.47 in) long, the wings maroon and 8–11 mm (0.31–0.43 in) long and the keel maroon and 6–7 mm (0.24–0.28 in) long. Flowering mainly occurs from September to January and the fruit is a flattened triangular pod about 10 mm (0.39 in) long.

== Taxonomy and naming ==
Daviesia alternifolia was first formally described in 1838 by Stephan Endlicher in the journal Annalen des Wiener Museums der Naturgeschichte. The specific epithet (alternifolia) means "alternate-leaved".

== Distribution and habitat ==
This species of pea mainly grows in open forest on flats, hillsides and swamps mainly in the Stirling Range, but also near Denmark and Cheyne Beach in the Esperance Plains, Jarrah Forest and Mallee biogeographic regions in the south-west of Western Australia.

== Conservation status ==
Daviesia alternifolia is classified as "not threatened" by the Government of Western Australia Department of Biodiversity, Conservation and Attractions.
