= The Last Whale =

2008 book by Chris Pash

- Author: Chris Pash
- Language: English
- Subject: Australian Whaling, Australian history
- Published: 2008
- Publisher: Fremantle Press
- Publication place: Australia
- Media type: Print (paperback)
- Pages: 218
- ISBN: 9781921361326
- OCLC: 233549892

The Last Whale is a 2008 book by Chris Pash, an Australian author and journalist. It is about the end of whaling in Australia including the closure of the last Australian whaling company, Cheynes Beach Whaling Company.

== Reception ==
The Last Whale has been reviewed by the Journal of Commonwealth Literature, and The Sydney Morning Herald. It was shortlisted for the 2009 Frank Broeze Memorial Maritime History Book Prize.

== See also ==
- Whaling in Western Australia
