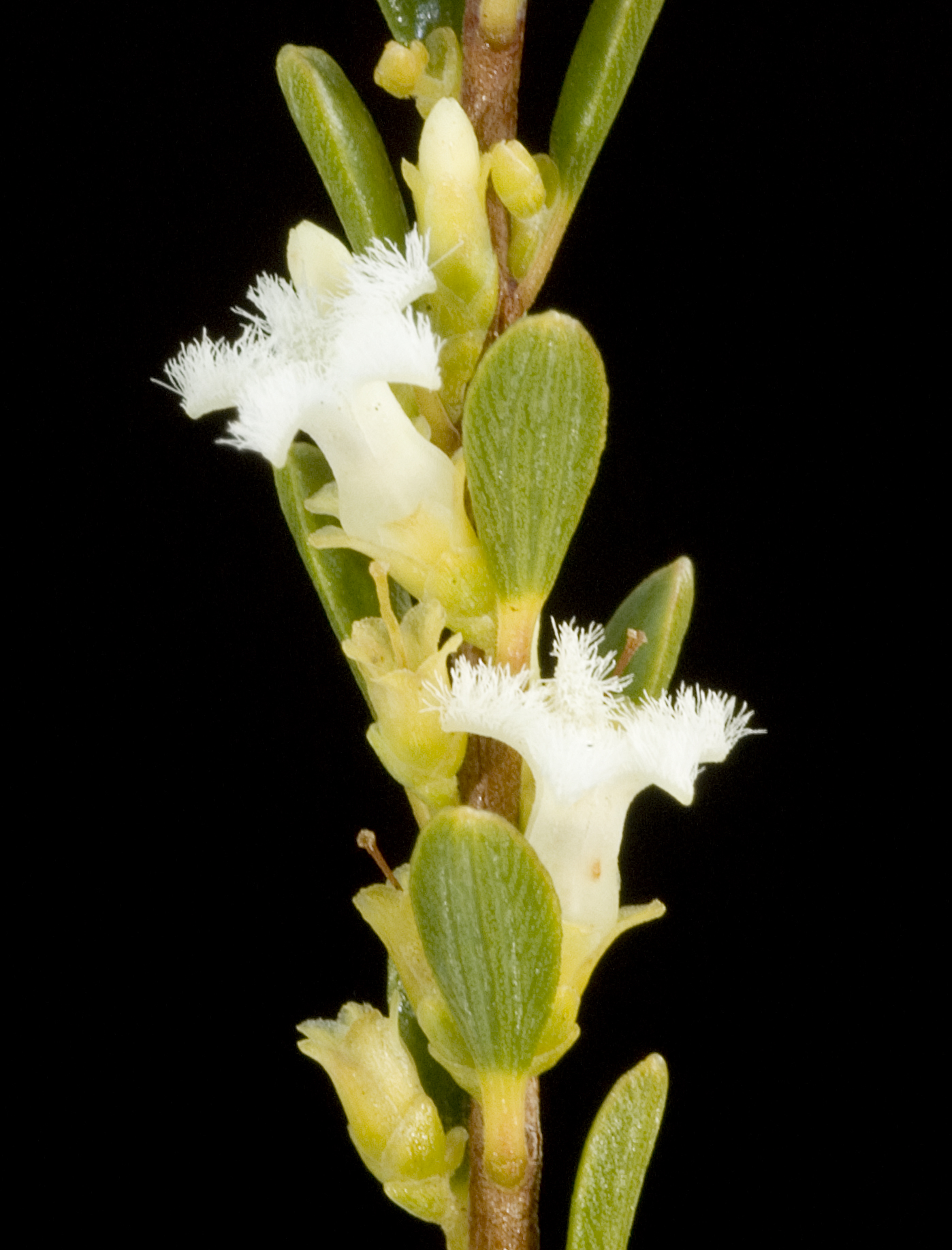

Scientific classification
- Kingdom: Plantae
- Clade: Tracheophytes
- Clade: Angiosperms
- Clade: Eudicots
- Clade: Asterids
- Order: Ericales
- Family: Ericaceae
- Genus: Styphelia
- Species: S. crassifolia

Binomial name
- Styphelia crassifolia (Sond.) F.Muell.
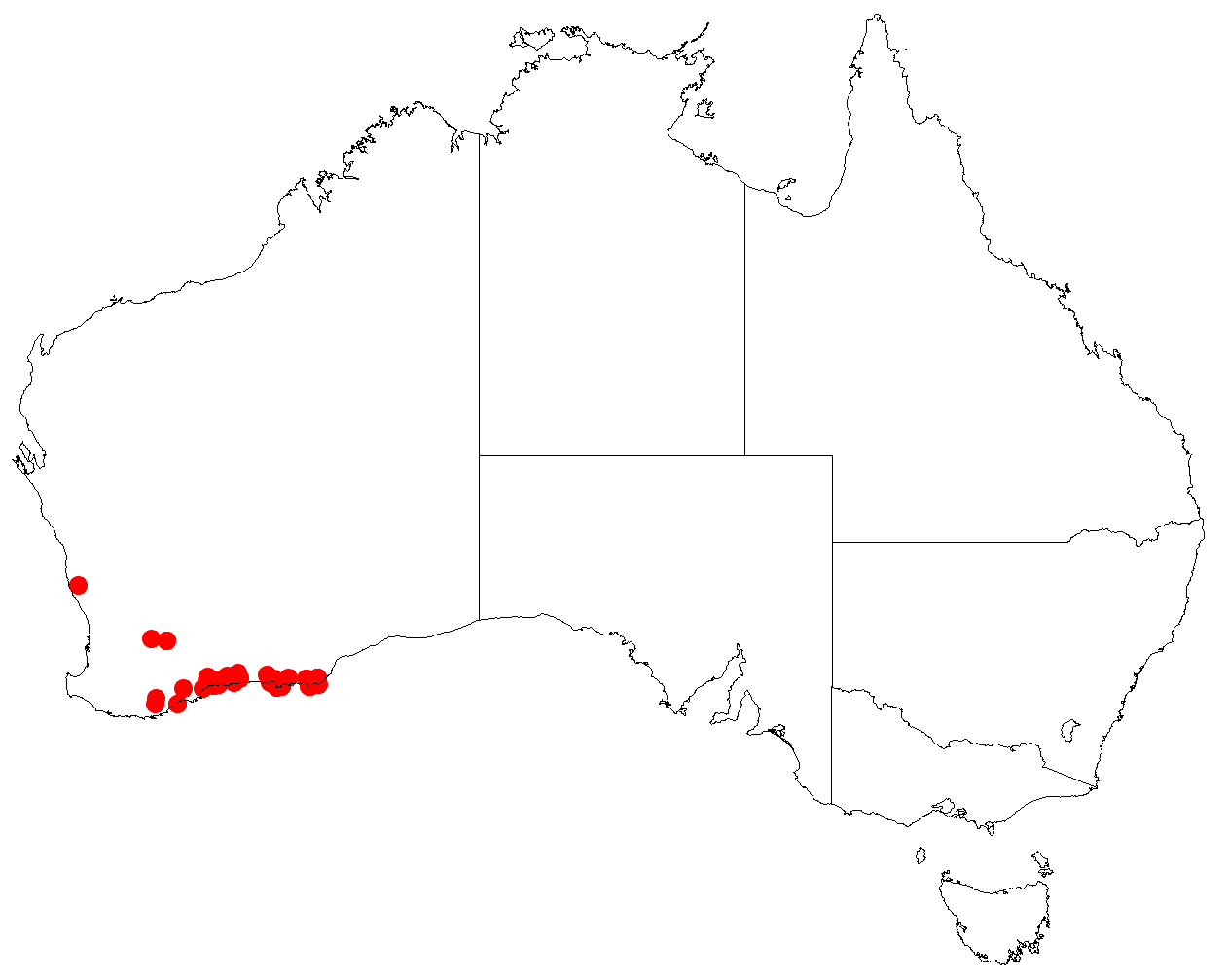
- Occurrence data from AVH

Synonyms
- Leucopogon crassifolius Sond.

= Styphelia crassifolia =

Species of flowering plant

Styphelia crassifolia is a species of flowering plant in the family Ericaceae and is endemic to [the south-west of Western Australia. It is an erect, bushy shrub that typically grows to a height of 60 cm (24 in). Its leaves are oblong, 4–9 mm (0.16–0.35 in) long on a short petiole, with 3 prominent ribs on the lower surface. One or two flowers are borne in leaf axils on a short peduncle with tiny bracts and bracteoles about half the length of the sepals. The sepals are about 1.6 mm (0.063 in) long and the petals are about 3.2 mm (0.13 in) long and joined at the base, the lobes about as long as the tube.

This species was first described in 1845 as Leucopogon crassifolius by Otto Wilhelm Sonder in Lehmann's Plantae Preissianae from specimens collected at Cape Riche. In 1867 Ferdinand von Mueller transferred it to the genus, Styphelia as S. crassifolia in his Fragmenta Phytographiae Australiae.

Styphelia crassifolia occurs in scattered locations mainly between the Fitzgerald River National Park and Cape Riche, with outliers north of Cheyne Beach and near Chillinup, in the Esperance Plains bioregion in the south-west of Western Australia.
