= Cheynes Beach =

Beach in Western Australia

- Beach
- Interactive map of Cheynes Beach
- Coordinates: 34°52′50.1″S 118°24′00.3″E
- Location: Cheynes, Western Australia, Australia

Cheynes Beach, also known as Cheyne Beach, is an unpatrolled beach in the locality of Cheynes, Western Australia. It is located approximately 50 kilometres north-east of Albany. The beach is named for George Cheyne, an early settler and whaler in south-western Australia.

From 1845 until 1877, a shore-based whaling station was established on the beach.

== Overview ==
A headland of granite boulders and shelf provides a small, sheltered harbour at the south-east edge of the beach. Bald Island lies 1.5 km offshore. A caravan park is located within the proximity of the beach.

The beach is considered one of four mother-calf southern right whale aggregation areas, alongside Cheyne Bay, Wray Bay, and Doubtful Island Bay. It is also sustains one of seven subpopulations of the noisy scrubbird.

== See also ==
- Cheynes Beach Whaling Station
- Hassell National Park
- Cheynes
