= Henry Kable =

Australian convict and businessman

- Born: 1763; Laxfield, Suffolk, England
- Died: 16 March 1846 (aged 82–83); Pitt Town, Sydney, Australia
- Resting place: Windsor
- Other name: Henry Cable
- Occupation: Entrepreneur
- Spouse: Susannah Holmes
- Children: 11

Henry Kable (1763–16 March 1846), born in Laxfield, Suffolk, England, was an Englishman transported to Australia in the First Fleet. He later became a prominent businessman.

== Conviction and transport to Australia ==
On 18 March 1783, Kable was convicted of burglary at Thetford, Norfolk, England and sentenced to death. His sentence was commuted to transportation for fourteen years to the United States, however, the American War of Independence made transportation to America impossible and Henry was returned to the Norwich Castle jail.

At Norwich Castle gaol, Henry met and began a relationship with Susannah Holmes, who gave birth in prison to a son Henry. Holmes had been sentenced to death on 22 March 1784 after being found guilty of theft. Her sentence was also commuted and she was sentenced to transportation to the United States colonies for a term of 14 years.

When Susannah was chosen to be transported to Botany Bay on the First Fleet, the ship's captain refused to accept the child on board as the order was only for Susannah. Moved by their plight several people became involved, ensuring Henry and the baby were included in the First Fleet, and money and goods were raised for them.

Mrs. Jackson, a well-known actress from Covent Garden, organised a public subscription which yielded a substantial sum to buy Henry and Susannah a parcel of goods on their arrival in the new colony. Lady Cadigan wife of Lord Cadigan, rewarded the turnkey after the event for his kindness in the Kable case. Henry and Susannah were transported on the ship the Friendship, sailing in the First Fleet to New South Wales.

== The Kable Case ==
A parcel of goods containing £20 alongside a number of other donated items was put together by Mrs Jackson was stowed on the ship Alexander delivery to the Kables in Australia. However, upon landing in New South Wales, the only contents of the parcel delivered to them were a few books. In the first civil suit heard in New South Wales, Henry Kable brought a claim against the Duncan Sinclair, the captain of the transport ship, for delivery of the parcel or its equivalent value.

Under the law of attaint, a death sentence in England also rendered convicts ‘civilly dead’. Even when granted mercy, convicts did not regain their rights to property or to sue. Had the Kables been in England, they would have had no legal recourse. However, the doctrine of reception permitted colonial judges to disregard and amend English law if required by local circumstance. As such, the judge-advocate permitted the action to proceed and ruled favour or the Kables, ordering the captain to pay £15 in compensation.

Contemporaneous records don’t specify the grounds for this departure from English precedent. However, most modern historians agree on the importance of convict property rights to New South Wales’ economic success. Perpetuating the law of attaint would likely have ‘created enormous difficulties for the colony’s commercial and legal affairs’. Indeed, within weeks of arriving in Australia, Governor Arthur Phillip recognised that work incentives dependent on property-rights were necessary for the survival of the colony.

In any case, the Kable case set a precedent which allowed for the emergence of an influential land-owning class of former convicts. Although this precedent was subsequently overturned in the Eagar case, this had little practical impact on the de-facto wealth of this land-owning class.

== Life in Australia ==
On 10 February 1788, Henry and Susannah Kable married in Sydney in a group wedding (the first European wedding ceremony in the new colony).

Soon after his arrival, Governor Phillip appointed Kable an overseer. The oddity of being the plaintiff in the first civil suit won by a convict may have brought Kable to the governor's notice, however, Kable later claimed to have had influential letters of recommendation.

In 1798, Kable opened a hotel called the Ramping Horse, from which he ran the first stage coach in Australia, and he also owned a retail store.

Henry became a constable of police, and later chief constable in the new colony and was involved on the prosecution side in criminal cases. Kable was dismissed 25 May 1802 for misbehaviour, after being convicted for breaches of the port regulations and illegally buying and importing pigs from a visiting ship. After this, he became merchant and ship owner. Like others in the colony, and perhaps because of his early success, Henry used the courts to argue cases against his opponents. He seems to have prospered; in 1808 shipping records show Kable and two partners, boat builder James Underwood and the other Simeon Lord, as principal ship owners in the expanding commerce of acquiring and exporting sealskins to the colony. Kable was one of 70 signatories to a petition to Governor Hunter from creditors who were anxious to prevent debtors from frustrating their demands by legal delays. The partnership dissolved in some bitterness shortly afterwards but not before Henry had managed to divest himself of a good deal of his property to his son, in order to avoid the consequences of any court order. Kable did much to pioneer sealing and shipbuilding in New South Wales, working with Simeon Lord who marketed the skins and James Underwood who built the ships. Their vessel King George became in 1805 the first locally owned vessel to go whaling. The ship made five whaling voyages for Kable and his partners between 1805 and 1811.

Like Lord and other early Sydney entrepreneurs, Kable always had a substantial landholding as a kind of 'sheet anchor'. He had been granted farms at Petersham Hill in 1794 and 1795, and in the latter year bought out four near-by grantees within a week of their grants being signed. In 1807 he owned at least four farms of about 170 acres (69 ha); in 1809 in addition he held five farms at the Hawkesbury and 300 acres (121 ha) at the Cowpastures, with a variety of real estate in Sydney itself including his comfortable house and extensive stores. He also had 40 horned cattle, 9 horses and 40 pigs. His business reputation seems to have been dubious, for he was regarded with distrust by Governor King and with active hostility by Governor Bligh who thought him and his partners fraudulent and had them imprisoned for a month and fined each £100 for sending him a letter couched in improper terms. It is certain that Kable played no part in public life comparable with Simeon Lord's multifarious activities. His commercial career in Sydney seems to have ended soon after Lord & Co. broke up, for as early as February 1810 he announced that his son Henry Junior had taken over the entire management of his Sydney affairs. In 1811 Kable moved to Windsor where he operated a store and brewery, the latter in association with a partner, Richard Woodbury and his Sydney warehouse was let to Michael Hayes.

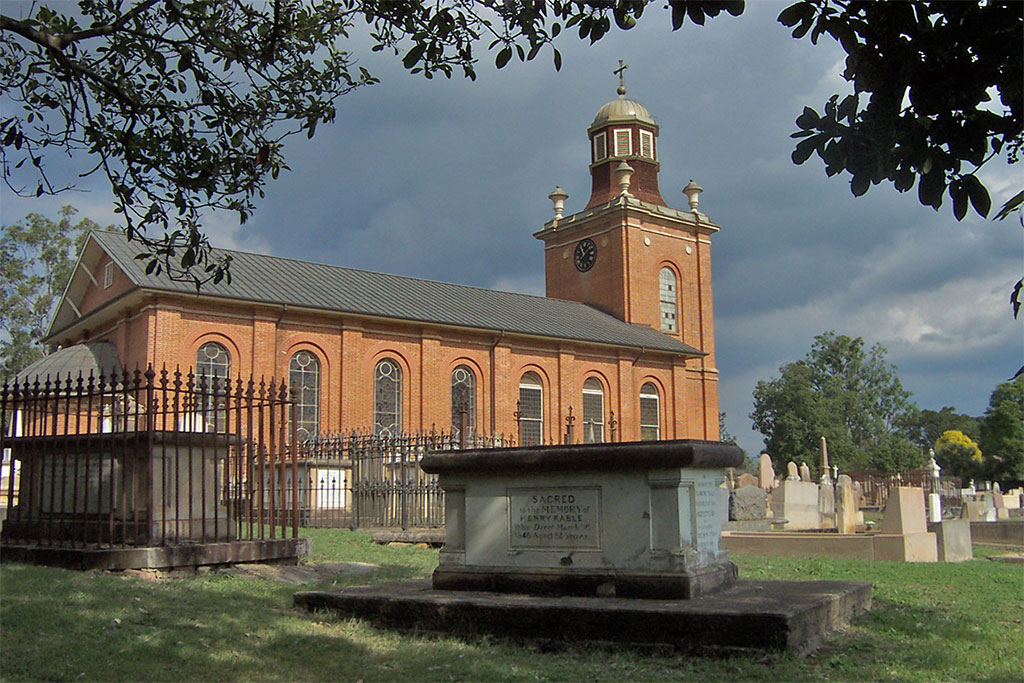
Kable's grave

Kable died on 16 March 1846, at Pitt Town near Windsor, New South Wales and was buried on 18 April 1846, at St Matthew's Anglican Church, Windsor.

== Legacy ==
Henry and Susannah Kable had 11 children in total. Henry who had been born in England and another 10 children born in New South Wales including Dianna (1788–1854), Enoch (1791–1793), James (1793–1809), Susannah (1796–1885), George Esto (1797–1853), Eunice (1799–1867), William Nathaniel (1801–1837) John (1802–1859), Charles Dickenson (born 1804), and Edgar James (1806–1849).

In 1968, on the 180th anniversary of the arrival of the First Fleet, more than a hundred descendants of Henry and Susannah Kable met in Sydney at Crows Nest to honour them as one of Australia's founding families. It was the first reunion of descendants in Australia to acknowledge convict ancestry.

The 1977 folk opera The Transports by Peter Bellamy is based on the story of Henry Kable and his wife Susannah.

In 1984, Zillah Kable Thomas and Lola Wilkinson, descendants of Henry and Susannah, unveiled a plaque commemorating Henry's land grant on the site of the former Regent Hotel (and the current Four Seasons Hotel) and the opening of the Kable's restaurant.

In 1988, a family reunion saw 500 of Kable's descendants meet to celebrate Henry and Susannah's 200th Wedding Anniversary and the Bicentenary of Australia on the site of the first gaol in Sydney and the one that Henry controlled as the first chief constable in the colony. The event was recognised as an official Bicentennial event by the Australian Bicentennial Authority.

In 2018 another family reunion was celebrated.

Celebrity veterinarian Katrina Warren is a descendant of Henry and Susannah Kable through their son John.

== Bibliography ==
- Kable, Paul; Whittaker, June (2007). Damned Rascals? : A chronicle of Henry & Susannah Kable 1764 - 1846. Sutton, N.S.W.: Kable Pictorial. ISBN 9780646480831.
- Neal, David (1991). The rule of law in a penal colony : law and power in early New South Wales. Melbourne: Cambridge University Press. ISBN 978-0-521-52297-7.
