= Banksia mucronulata subsp. mucronulata =

Scientific classification
- Kingdom: Plantae
- Clade: Tracheophytes
- Clade: Angiosperms
- Clade: Eudicots
- Order: Proteales
- Family: Proteaceae
- Genus: Banksia
- Species: B. mucronulata (R.Br.) A.R.Mast & K.R.Thiele
- Subspecies: B. m. subsp. mucronulata

Trinomial name
- Banksia mucronulata subsp. mucronulata

Synonyms
- Dryandra mucronulata R.Br. subsp. mucronulata

Subspecies of plant found in Australia

Banksia mucronulata subsp. mucronulata is a subspecies of Banksia mucronulata (swordfish dryandra). As an autonym, it is defined as encompassing the type material of the species. It was known as Dryandra mucronulata subsp. mucronulata until 2007, when Austin Mast and Kevin Thiele transferred all Dryandra into Banksia. As with other members of Banksia ser. Dryandra, it is endemic to the South West Botanical Province of Western Australia.
