= Hassell National Park =

National park in Western Australia

- IUCN category II (national park)
- Location within Western Australia
- Location: Western Australia
- Nearest city: Albany
- Coordinates: 34°40′44″S 118°22′11″E
- Area: 12.65 km^{2} (4.88 sq mi)
- Established: 1971
- Governing body: Department of Environment and Conservation

Hassell National Park is a national park in the Great Southern region of Western Australia, 367 kilometres (228 mi) southeast of Perth and 57 km (35 mi) north east of Albany.

It is named after John Hassell, a retired sea captain, who was responsible for opening up extensive areas in the south of the state during the 1850s as he extended his pastoral leases east from Frankland as far as Jerramungup.

The park straddles the South Coast Highway between Manypeaks and Wellstead.

The site is regarded as an important ecological area as a result of it being a largely intact vegetation and wildlife corridor that serves to link the Mount Manypeaks and Waychinicup areas with the Cheynes Beach and Pallinup areas.

The park has no entry fee and has no facilities provided for visitors.

A population of the very rare Brown's banksia, composed of 100 to 200 plants, can be found within the confines of the park.

== See also ==
- Protected areas of Western Australia
