= Cheynes, Western Australia =

Locality in the City of Albany, Western Australia

Cheynes
- other
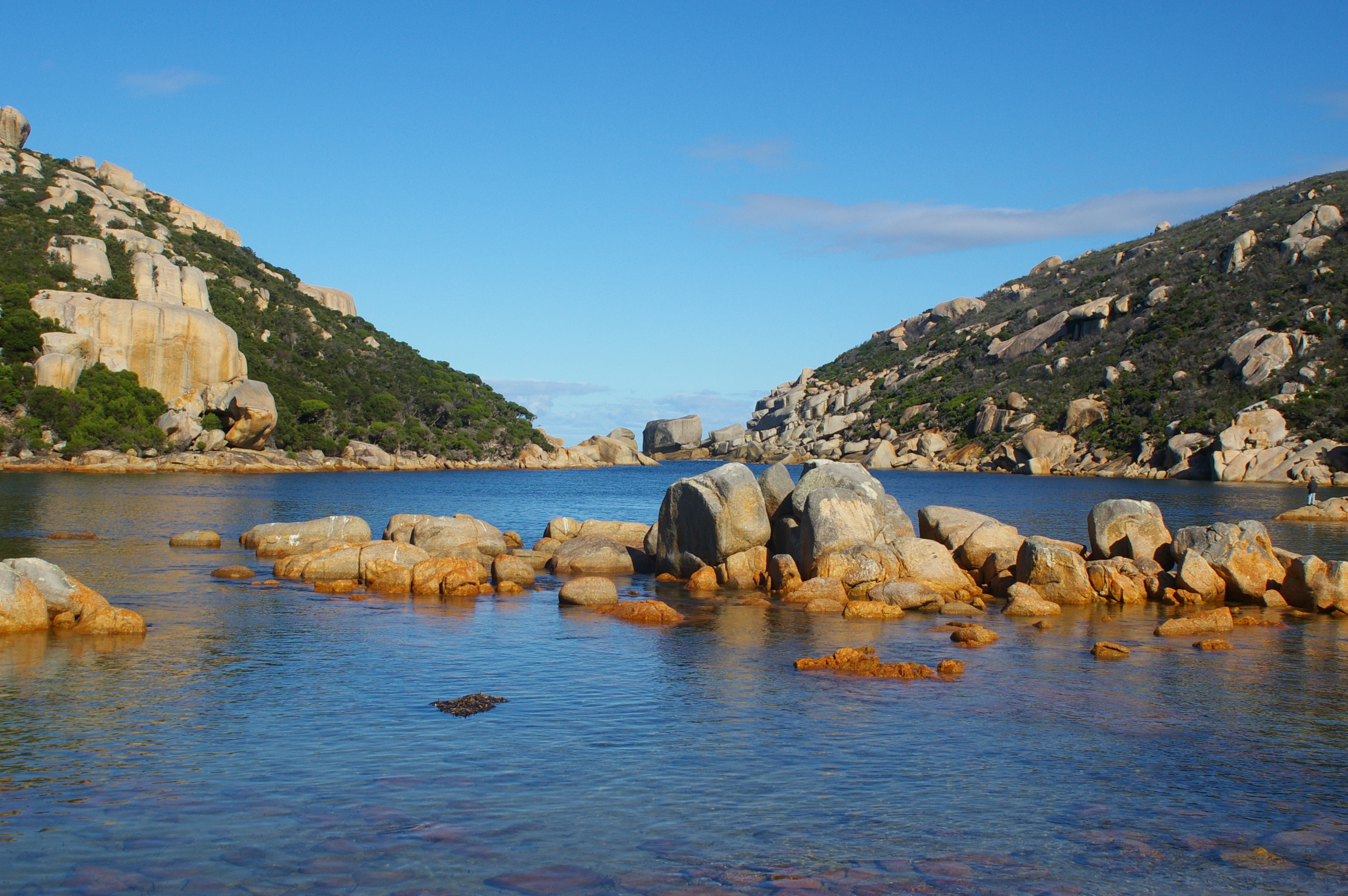
- Waychinicup Inlet in Waychinicup National Park

- Coordinates: 34°50′9″S 118°20′2″E
- Country: Australia
- State: Western Australia
- LGA: City of Albany
- Location: 461.7 km (286.9 mi) from Perth; 198 km (123 mi) from Kojonup; 2.7 km (1.7 mi) from Albany

Government
  - State electorate: Albany
  - Federal division: O'Connor

Area
  - Total: 180.2 km^{2} (69.6 sq mi)

Population
  - Total: 37 (2021)
  - Density: 0.2053/km^{2} (0.532/sq mi)
- Postcode: 6328

Cheynes is a locality of the City of Albany in the Great Southern region of Western Australia. The entirety of Waychinicup National Park is located within Cheynes. It is located 59.5 km (37.0 mi) from Albany.

== Demographics ==
As of the 2021 Australian census, 37 people resided in Cheynes, up from 11 in the 2016 census. The median age of persons in Cheynes was 53 years. There were more males than females, with 54.1% of the population male and 45.9% female. The average household size was 2.3 people per household.
