= King George (1805 ship) =

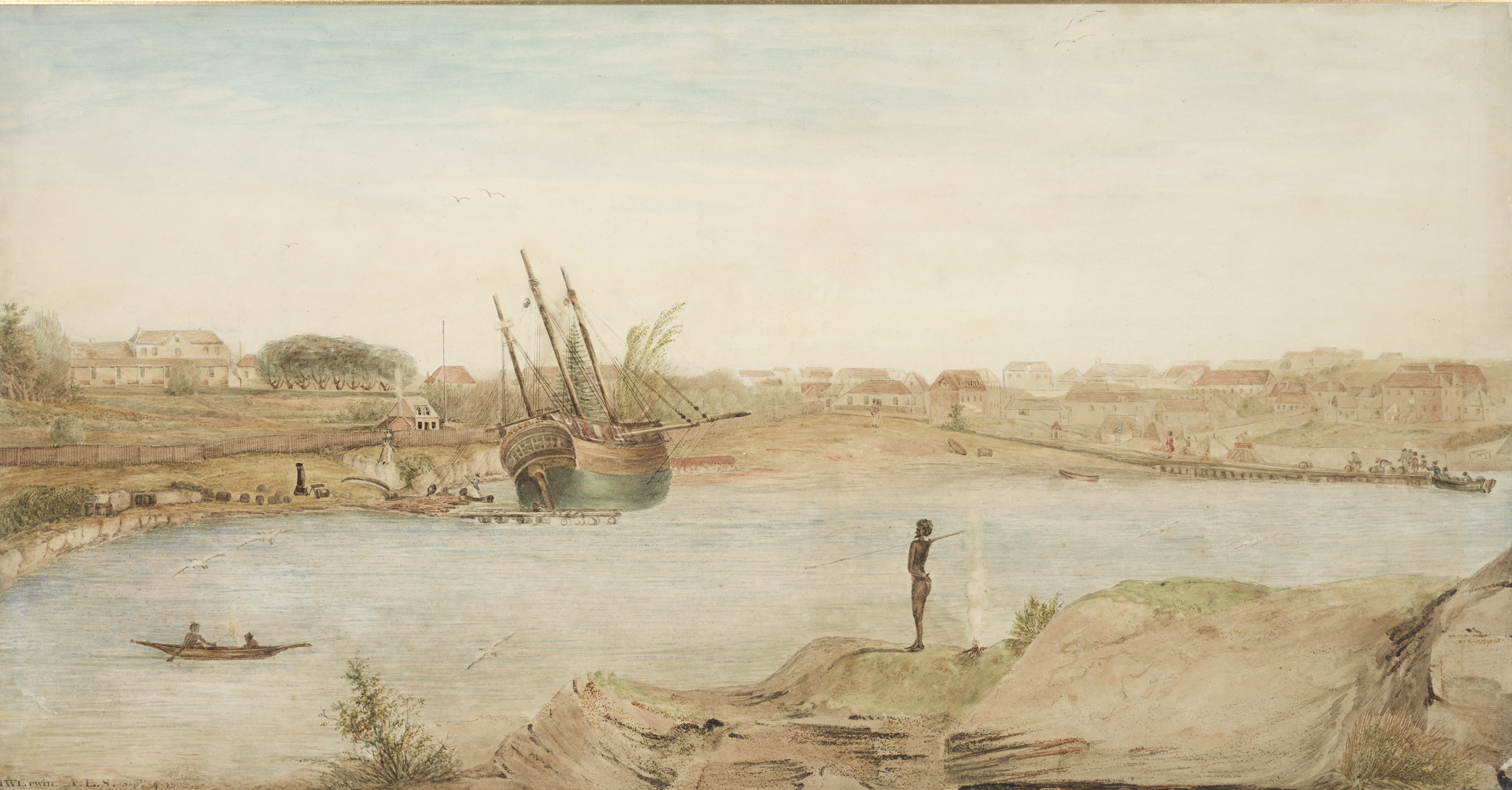
- Painting by John Lewin possibly showing King George with her yards lowered undergoing hull maintenance in Sydney Cove c.1808

History
- Name: King George
- Builder: Underwood and Kable, Sydney, New South Wales
- Laid down: 1804
- Launched: April 1805
- Completed: May 1805
- Fate: Hulk in 1820s

General characteristics
- Type: Whaler / cargo ship
- Tons burthen: 180, or 185, or 188, or 200 (bm)
- Length: 87 ft 6 in (26.67 m) o/a
- Beam: 22 ft 7 in (6.88 m)
- Depth of hold: 14 ft (4.3 m)
- Sail plan: Full-rigged ship

Colonial Ship King George was the first ship, by virtue of having three masts, built in the colony of Sydney, New South Wales.

King George was described variously as a square-rigged ship and a three-masted schooner, known in America during the later 19th century as a "tern". The confusion is due to her being modeled on the Baltimore-built three-masted schooners that had sail plans which resembled the square-rigged ships. These ships came into use in the later half of the 18th century, and would have been known to James Underwood, the shipyard builder. Their distinctive sail plan feature was in having the extremely large fore and main courses, and only the fore and main topsails, with the mizzen mast rigged with the mainsail and main-topsail in place of the spanker, a plan based on the two-masted Boston pilot schooner that eventually evolved into the famed Baltimore clippers in the 1830s. The fore and staysail booms were omitted to allow stowage of extra whaling boats and other equipment.

James Underwood undertook to build the ship with Messrs. Kable and Co. as partners and using a bond of £2,000 from Simeon Lord, a prominent colonial personality. One difficulty in securing permission to build the ship was due to the proclamation by Governor King of disallowing the building of any ship that could compete with the East India Company's trade in the Asian waters. Later Lord would try to get around the provisions by asking permission to send King George to Fiji for sandalwood, and then to China for "a cargo".

Underwood and Kable were responsible for a number of smaller vessels and sloops, but fully-rigged King George would be their most ambitious construction. The keel was laid down in 1804, and she was completed with an overall length of 87 feet, a beam of 22 feet 7 inches and a 14 feet hold. Her burthen was computed at upwards of 200 tons but she is mentioned by other sources as having a burthen of 180 or 185 tons. Launched in April 1805, she completed fit-out and was registered in May 1805.

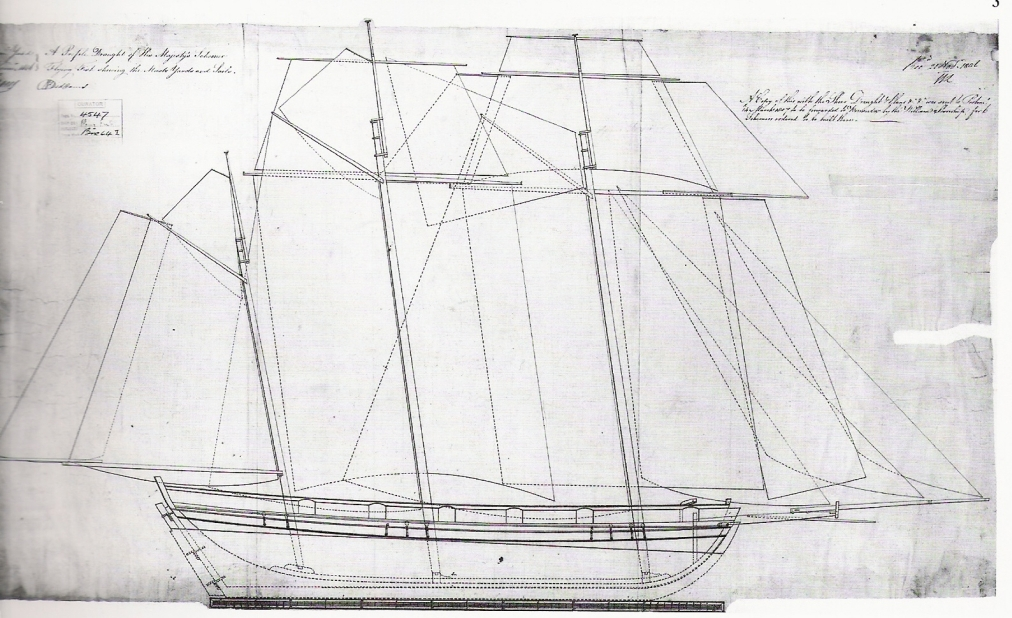
Drawing for the Flying Fish class, which King George would have resembled, modelled on an American vessel, sent to Bermudian builders by the British Admiralty.

It is highly probable that Governor King recognised the need for the colony to have a substantial and fast ship in case of emergencies, and to maintain better communications with the rest of the British Empire from such a far outpost, but due to the considerations of the East India Company's monopoly King George was fitted out as a whaler "expected to proceed on the sperm fishery of the coast of New Zealand" This was an entirely sound commercial decision due to the rapid development of the whaling industry off the Australian Eastern coast, with three whalers arriving in the Third Fleet, soon followed by more, including from America.

Indeed, her initial cruises were mostly in conducting whaling and seal trapping as The [Sydney] Gazette on 10 August 1806 recorded the arrival of "the private colonial ship King George, from a successful cruise, in which she had the good fortune to kill fifteen black whale." She spent the next several years in the southern waters, under her Master S. R. Chace, when she was spotted by Perseverance towards the end of November in 1809 at the Aucklands after she sailed from Sydney in June 1809. During this early part of her history she is known as a whaling ship King George, which regularly left Port Jackson on a whale and seal hunt. However, complying with trade restrictions these were short cruises, and for example on 2 March 1810, she "arrived with skins and [whale] oil, having been at the entrance of the Bay of Islands 18 days previous."

However, soon the colonial policy was relaxed, and she was reported returning from sailing under Captain L. Jones, "from the sperm whale fishery, having procured from 30 to 35 tons of oil; out 14 months.", a cruise that would have taken her to many other ports around the Pacific Ocean.

Later in her history King George took on cargo and general trade cruises, when she "last returned from the Bay of Islands and Marquesas, laden with sandal wood and pork, the Colonial Ship, King George, Captain Beveridge." This was one of her last cruises from Port Jackson. King George finished her life in Sydney as a hulk in the 1820s.
