= James Underwood (businessman) =

Shipwright, merchant businessman and distiller in Australia

- Born: 4 September 1771; Bermondsey, London
- Died: 10 February 1844 (aged 72)
- Citizenship: Australian
- Occupation: Businessman
- Known for: Business
- Children: 7 (2 died in infancy)

James Underwood (4 September 1771 – 10 February 1844) was a noted shipwright, merchant businessman and distiller in Australia. Born in Bermondsey, London, he was shipped to Australia as a convicted felon in 1790. He learned his trade in Sydney, becoming joint owner of a merchant ship, Diana in 1799. He co-founded Kable & Underwood, along with Henry Kable which was a merchant trading company, and utilised Diana for seal hunting in the Bass Strait. The Hannah and Sally they used for trading. They also owned the Sydney Cove (252 tons) which they sent whaling.

As his enterprise expanded, Underwood added coal and sandalwood shipping to his business interests, increased the size of his fleet, and added Simeon Lord as a business partner. He continued to build ships, including a 200 tonne King George, and Casuarina bought by the French explorer Nicolas Baudin. He became one of the leading figures of the fledgling sealing industry in New South Wales, employing over sixty men and bringing 30,000 skins annually. He returned to London to sell over 120,000 skins, and with the proceeds bought out his partner, Lord.

On return to New South Wales he founded a coffee lounge, helped found the Commercial Society of Sydney and also joined the Standing Committee of the Emancipated Colonists of New South Wales. He became a leading merchant, and "one of the few merchants engaged in importing from Europe and India". He built a distillery with two more business partners whom he subsequently bought out. The proceeds of his expanding businesses funded a homestead said to be among "the three or four finest in Sydney".

He returned to England to retire in 1840 and died four years later in Tulse Hill in south London. He was married twice, in 1812 and again in 1825 after the death of his first wife. He had seven children in total, two of whom died in infancy.
