= Cheyne Beach Whaling Station =

Cheynes Beach Whaling Station
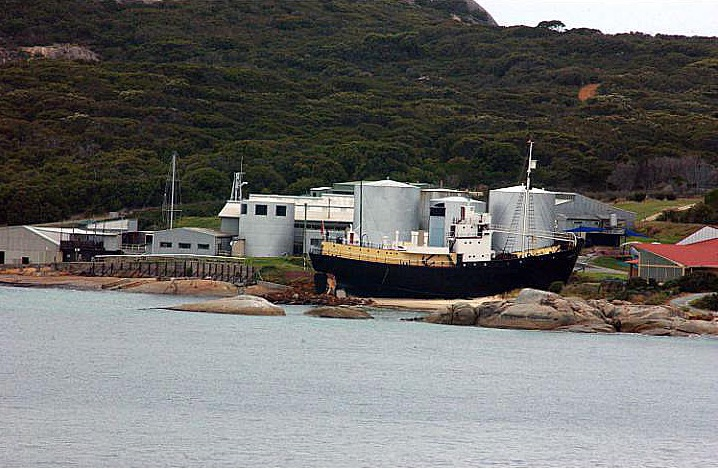
- The station in 2013

General information
- Type: Historic Whaling Station
- Location: Albany, Western Australia
- Coordinates: 35°05′41″S 117°57′35″E

Western Australia Heritage Register
- Type: State Registered Place
- Designated: 15 May 1998
- Reference no.: 3644

Cheynes Beach Whaling Station is a defunct whaling station located in Albany, Western Australia. It now operates as an award-winning tourist attraction known as Albany's Historic Whaling Station, and has previously also been known as Whaleworld and Whale World. The station is situated in Frenchman Bay in King George Sound and was built in the 1950s, operating until 1978.

The station takes its name from Cheynes Beach, a small coastal community located approximately 65 kilometres (40 mi) east of Albany and is surrounded by Waychinicup National Park.

== History ==
Whalers had been recorded at Cheynes Beach in the 1840s with a commercial fishing operation being established there in 1920. Whaling recommenced there in the early 1950s and the Cheynes Beach Whaling Company was formed by a family syndicate of eight fishermen. The syndicate was headed by two Albany men, G. R. Birss and C. Westerberg, who expected to outlay £A 20,000, equivalent to A$1.16 million in 2022, on the venture. The business was relocated to the Frenchman Bay site shortly afterward.

Quotas were set for humpback whales in 1951, but the station was established at the Frenchman Bay site in 1952. The industrial facility was built to process whales caught in the area and is composed of a number of large steel and concrete sheds and workshops, smaller timber-framed offices and amenities buildings along with tanks and boilers. Much of the station was constructed from old mining equipment along with an alcohol distillation plant from Collie. The flensing deck was built over a natural rock slipway with steam winches installed further up the shore to haul the carcasses onto the deck. The initial quota for the first year was 50 humpback whales.

The station produced a total of 508 tonnes (500 long tons) of whale oil during the 1953 season. The oil was loaded aboard the Norwegian boat Toulouse ferried by the chaser Cheynes from the station to the boat.

In 1954 the station loaded over 1,016 tonnes (1,000 long tons) of whale oil, product of 120 whales for the entire season, directly onto the Norwegian ship Tiber using the station chaser Cheynes again. The oil had an estimated value of £A 100,000, equivalent to A$3.9 million in 2022.

The company slowly continued to grow and in 1957 purchased a second chaser Kos VII.

Following a disastrous season in 1962 with record low catches the International Whaling Commission ended whaling of humpbacks from Antarctic stocks so the company commenced hunting sperm whales instead. The enterprise remained profitable with the company recording a net profit of A$100,362 in 1969, equivalent to A$1.35 million in 2022, that grew to A$304,329 in 1970, equivalent to A$3.96 million in 2022. The higher profits were due to a record catch of sperm whales at the station, 764 in total, and unprecedented world demand for oil. The company employed over 100 staff, and the oil was being used by NASA and to make Swiss watches. Whaling continued from the station until 1978 when the last whale was legally caught in Australian waters.

A total of 1136 humpbacks and 14,695 sperm whales were caught from the station between 1952 and 1978.

The Cheynes Beach Whaling Company closed in 1978 and the site was given to Jaycees Community Foundation in 1980. The Foundation converted the station to a museum named Whaleworld using government and private funding. Whaleworld was officially opened in May 1985. The current name of the museum is Albany's Historic Whaling Station.

The station operated a small fleet of whale chasers, most notably the Cheynes line of four steamers. Cheynes I was deliberately sunk in 1959 off Michaelmas Island in the King George Sound. The remaining vessels all met various fates following the station's closure: Cheynes II broke free from the Albany jetty in 1992 and grounded on a sandbank in the Princess Royal Harbour; Cheynes III was deliberately sunk in 1982 to create a recreational diving site; and Cheynes IV remains beached at Albany's Historic Whaling Station, serving as a museum ship.

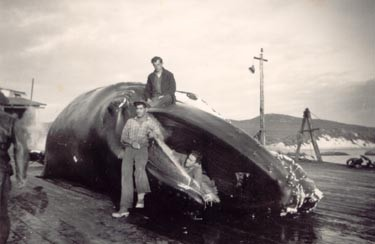
Cheynes Beach Whaling Station in the early 1950s

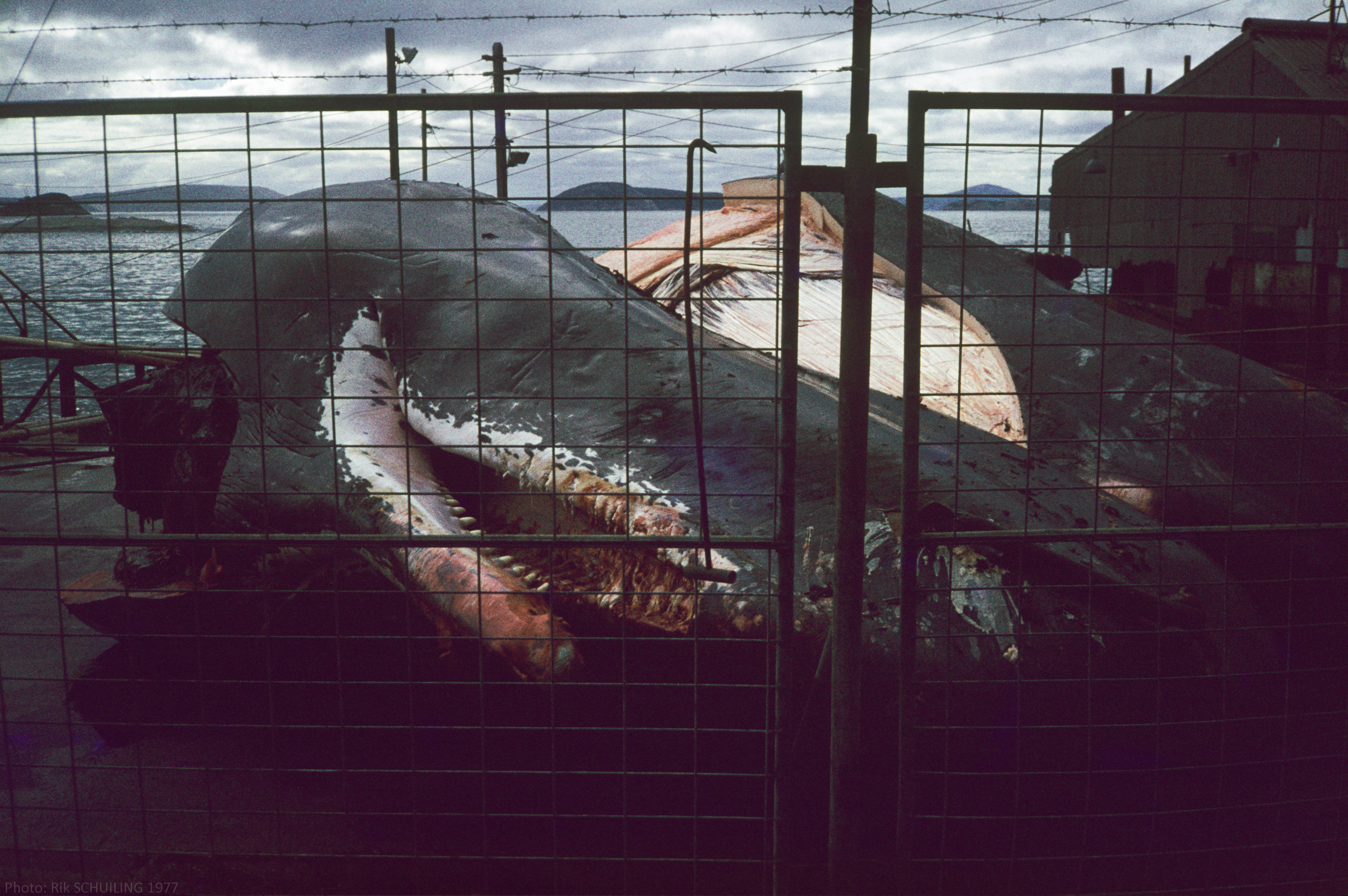
Sperm whale at the station in 1977

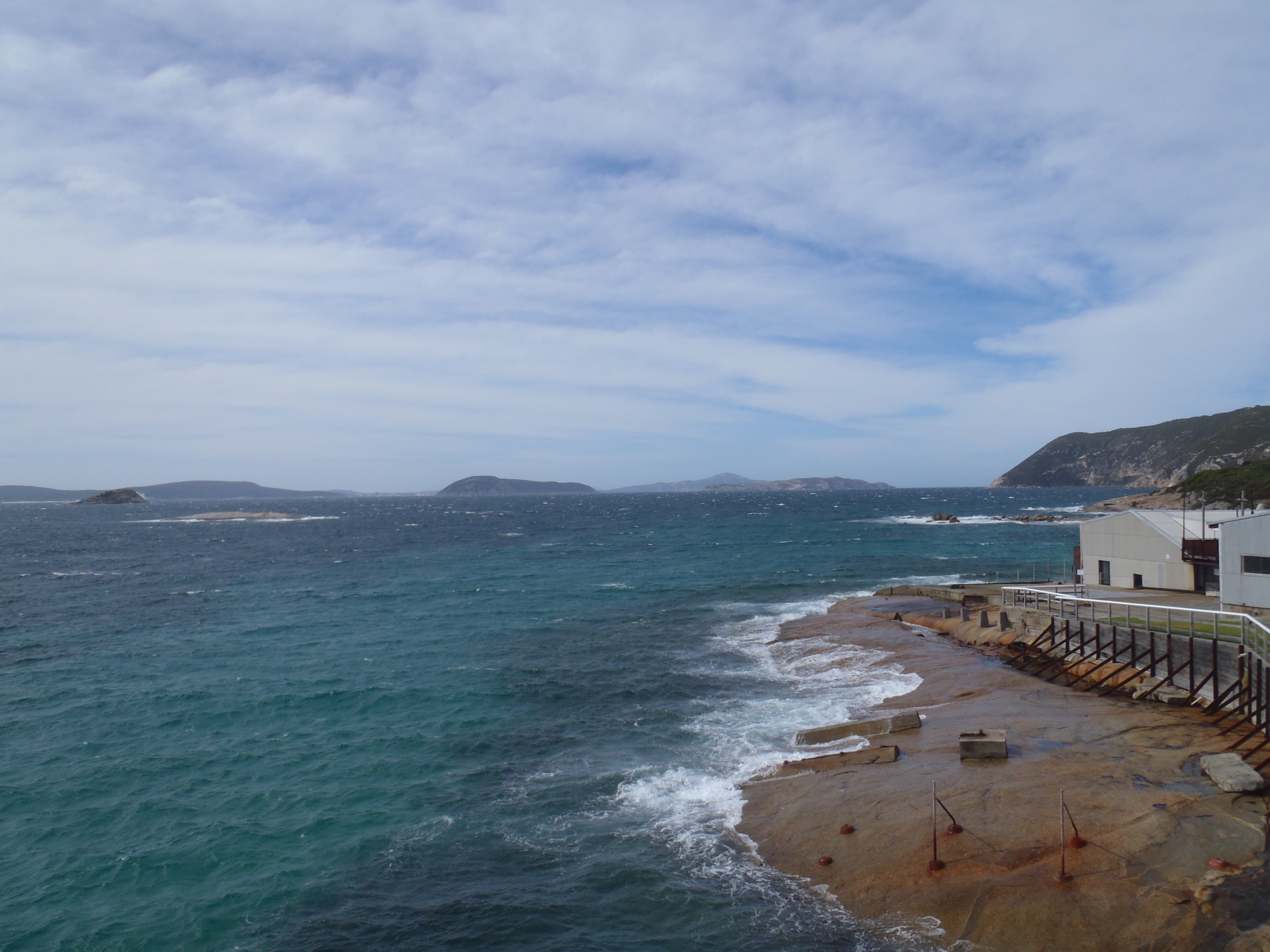
King George Sound from the station

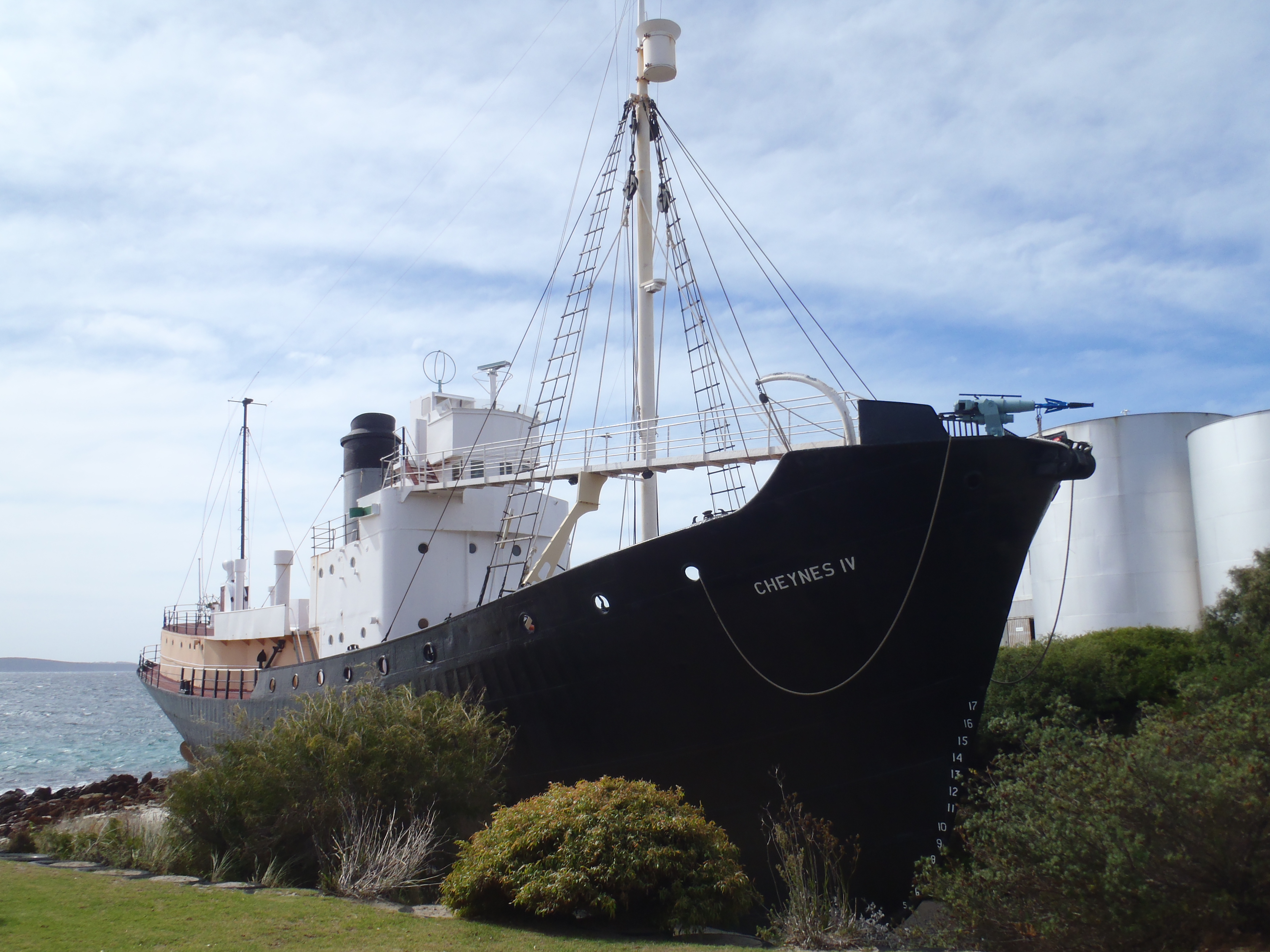
Cheynes IV whale chaser

== Australian Wildlife Park Albany ==
The Australian Wildlife Park Albany located adjacent to the Cheyne Beach Whaling Station Museum is a 1.3-hectare (3.2-acre) wildlife park that offers closeup experiences with native animals such as:

- Southern Hairy-nosed wombat
- Brushtail possums (including rare golden-coated individuals)
- Quenda bandicoots
- Red kangaroos (including rare white coloration
- Western grey kangaroos
- Tammar wallabies
- Bennett wallabies
- Tasmanian pademelons
- Long-nose potoroos
- Rufous bettongs
- Brush-tailed bettongs (Woylie)
- Stimson's python
- Lizards
- Tawny frog mouth
- bush stone-curlew
- Owls
- Major Mitchell cockatoos

== See also ==
- The Last Whale
- Whaling in Australia
- Whaling in Western Australia
