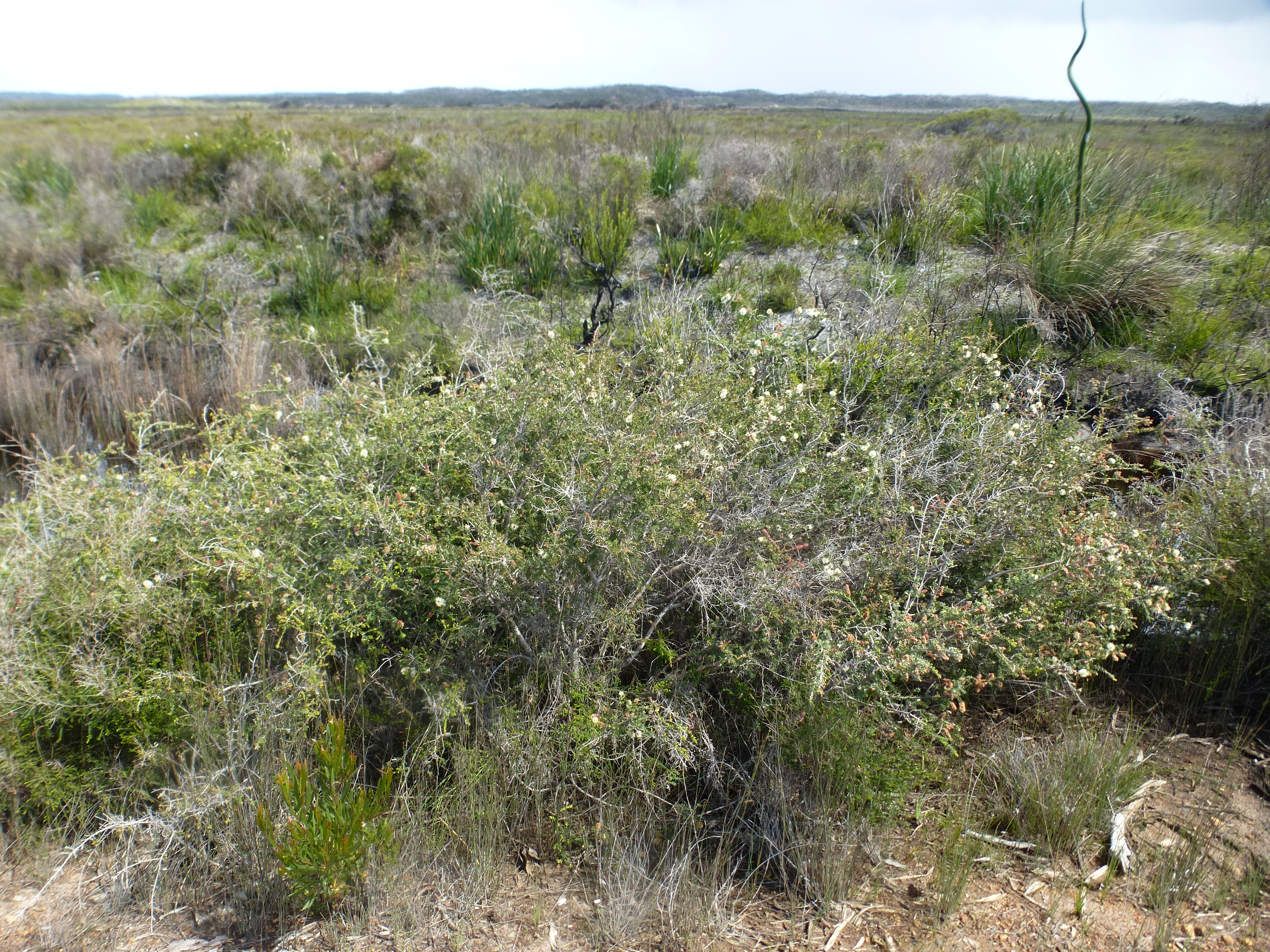
- Melaleuca incana subsp. incana growing near Point d'Entrecasteaux.

Scientific classification
- Kingdom: Plantae
- Clade: Tracheophytes
- Clade: Angiosperms
- Clade: Eudicots
- Clade: Rosids
- Order: Myrtales
- Family: Myrtaceae
- Genus: Melaleuca
- Species: M. incana R.Br.
- Subspecies: M. i. subsp. incana

Trinomial name
- Melaleuca incana subsp. incana

= Melaleuca incana subsp. incana =

Subspecies of flowering plant

Melaleuca incana subsp. incana, commonly known as grey honey-myrtle, is a plant in the myrtle family Myrtaceae which is endemic to the south-west of Western Australia and is naturalised in the south of Victoria in Australia. It is commonly grown as a garden plant and produces large numbers of white or creamy yellow flowers in early spring.

== Description ==
Melaleuca incana subsp. incana is a medium to tall shrub with weeping branches. It grows to a height of about 3 metres (10 ft) and has rough, grey bark. The leaves are in opposite pairs, sometimes rings of three, curved and crowded along the branchlets, 3.5–17 millimetres (0.1–0.7 in) long and 0.5–3.5 millimetres (0.02–0.1 in) wide, linear or very narrow elliptic in shape and tapering to a point. The leaves and young branches are covered with fine, soft hairs giving the foliage a grey appearance.

The flowers are arranged in spikes, usually on the ends of branches which continue to grow after flowering. Each spike has between 6 and 55 individual flowers and is up to 30 millimetres (1 in) long and 15 millimetres (0.6 in) wide, white, creamy white or yellow. The petals are 0.7–2.0 millimetres (0.03–0.08 in) long and fall off as the flower ages. The stamens are arranged in five bundles around the flower, each bundle containing between 3 and 11 stamens. Flowering mainly occurs in August to September and is followed by woody capsules 1.5–4 millimetres (0.06–0.2 in) long in cylinder-shaped clusters up to 30 millimetres (1 in) long.

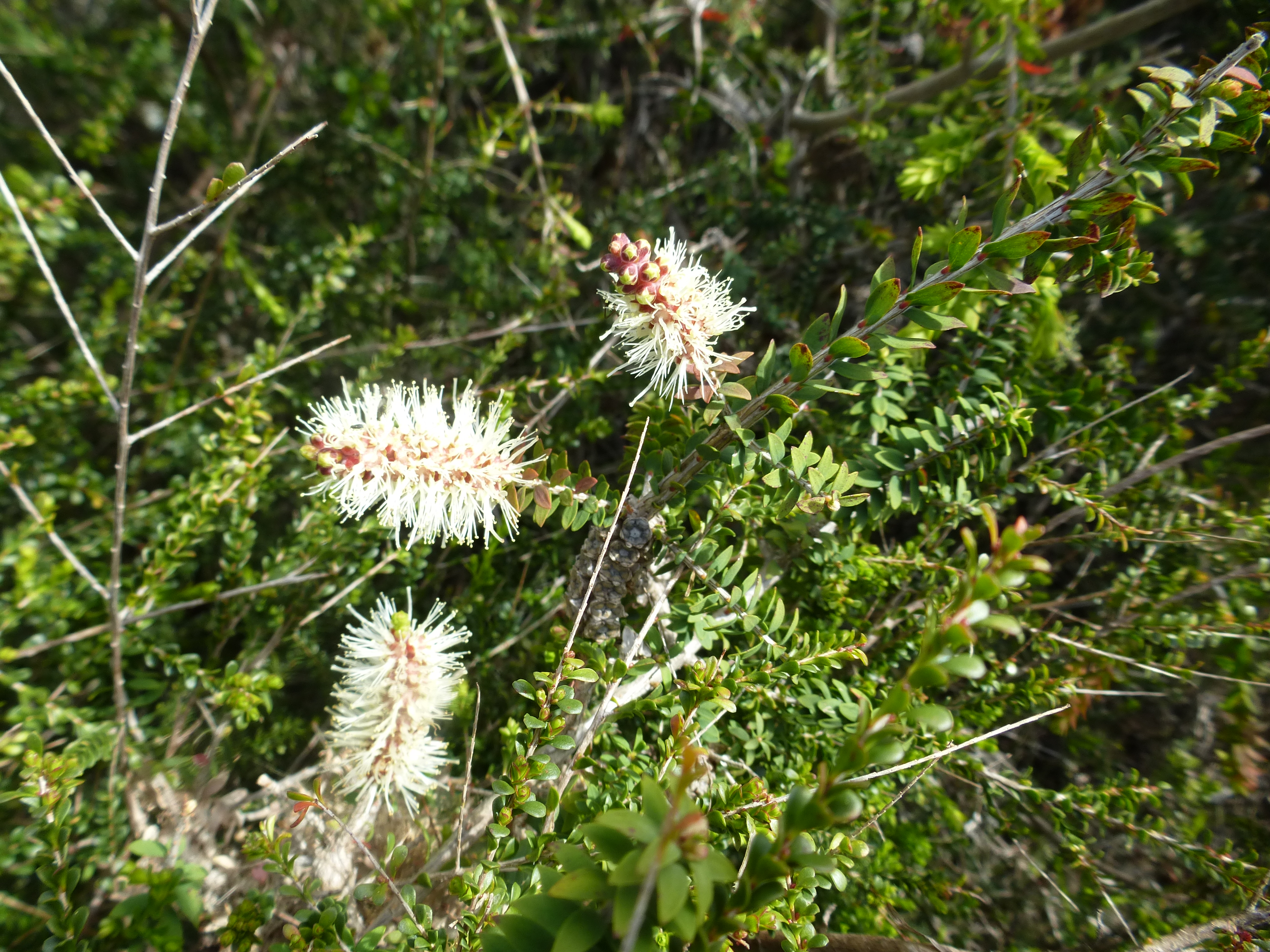
Melaleuca incana incana leaves and flowers

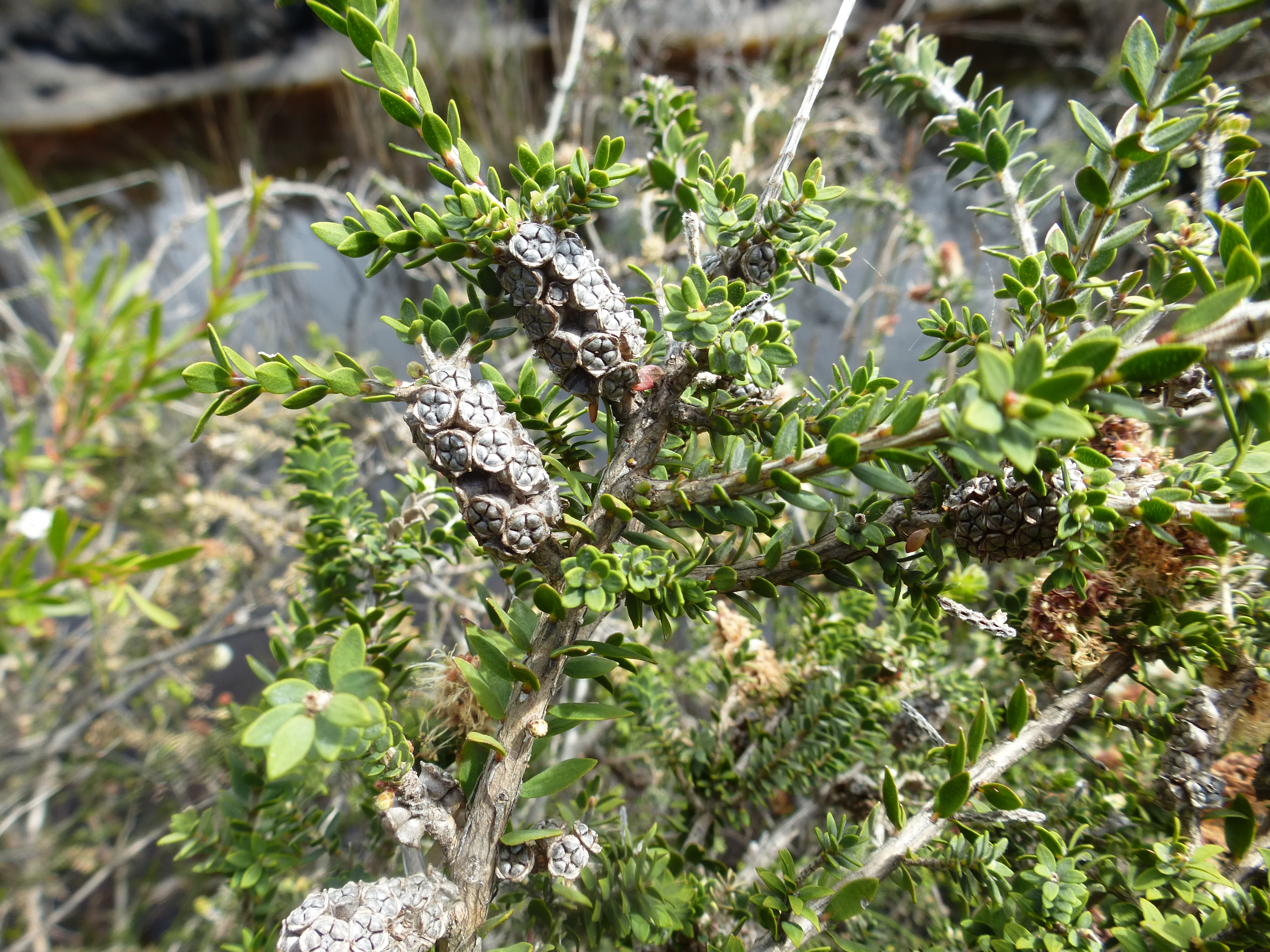
Melaleuca incana incana fruits

== Taxonomy and naming ==
This species was first described in 1819 by Robert Brown in Edward's Botanical Register. Edwards called the plant "Grizzly Melaleuca" and noted that the plant was ...first observed by Mr. Brown, in King George the Third's Sound, on the south-west coast of New Holland. ... We were favoured with the specimen, for the drawing, by Lady Aylesford ... We are indebted to Mr. Brown for the specific characters, and all we know concerning the plant. The specific epithet (incana) "is from the Latin incanus, hoary, white, in reference to the colour of the leaves".

== Distribution and habitat ==
Melaleuca incana subsp. incana occurs between Albany and Jurien Bay and inland as far as the Dryandra woodland in the Avon Wheatbelt, Geraldton Sandplains, Jarrah Forest, Swan Coastal Plain and Warren biogeographic region. It is also naturalised in the Gippsland and Otway plains areas of Victoria.

== Uses ==
=== Horticulture ===
Melaleuca incana subspecies incana is widely cultivated. It is a hardy plant, fast growing, tolerating a range of soils and conditions after initial establishment and is frost hardy. It is widely available in commercial nurseries and tolerates pruning to form a hedge. It is susceptible to scale insect attack.
