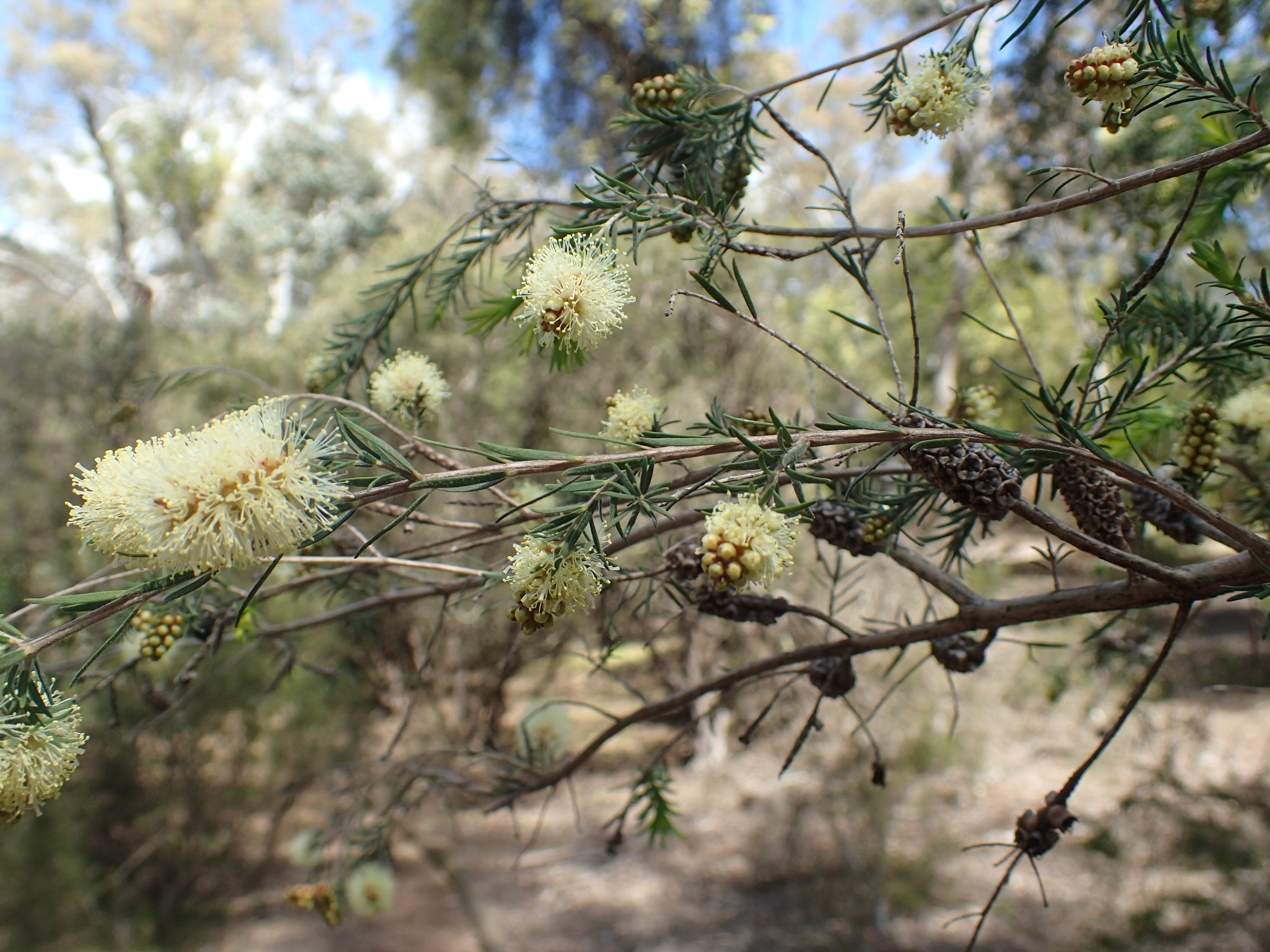
- Melaleuca incana subsp. tenella foliage and flowers

Scientific classification
- Kingdom: Plantae
- Clade: Tracheophytes
- Clade: Angiosperms
- Clade: Eudicots
- Clade: Rosids
- Order: Myrtales
- Family: Myrtaceae
- Genus: Melaleuca
- Species: M. incana
- Subspecies: M. i. subsp. tenella

Trinomial name
- Melaleuca incana subsp. tenella (Benth.) Barlow

= Melaleuca incana subsp. tenella =

Subspecies of flowering plant

Melaleuca incana subsp. tenella is a plant in the myrtle family Myrtaceae which is endemic to the south coast of Western Australia. It was formerly known as Melaleuca tenella Benth. but was reduced to a subspecies in 1998. It is similar to M. incana subsp. incana except in the form of the plant, the size and shape of its leaves, its flowering time and distribution.

== Description ==
Melaleuca incana subsp. tenella is an erect, spreading shrub, sometimes a small tree growing to a height of 5 metres (20 ft) and with thin outer branches. The leaves are in opposite pairs, sometimes rings of three, curved and crowded along the branchlets, 3.5–9 millimetres (0.1–0.4 in) long and 0.5–1.1 millimetres (0.02–0.04 in) wide, and narrow lance-shaped. The leaves and young branches are covered with fine, soft hairs giving the foliage a grey appearance.

The flowers are arranged in spikes, usually on the ends of branches which continue to grow after flowering. Each spike has between 6 and 55 individual flowers and is up to 30 millimetres (1 in) long and 15 millimetres (0.6 in) wide, white, creamy white or yellow. The petals are 0.7–2.0 millimetres (0.03–0.08 in) long and fall off as the flower ages. The stamens are arranged in five bundles around the flower, each bundle containing between 3 and 11 stamens. Flowering mainly occurs in October and is followed by woody capsules 3–4 millimetres (0.1–0.2 in) in diameter in cup-shaped clusters up to 20 millimetres (0.8 in) long.

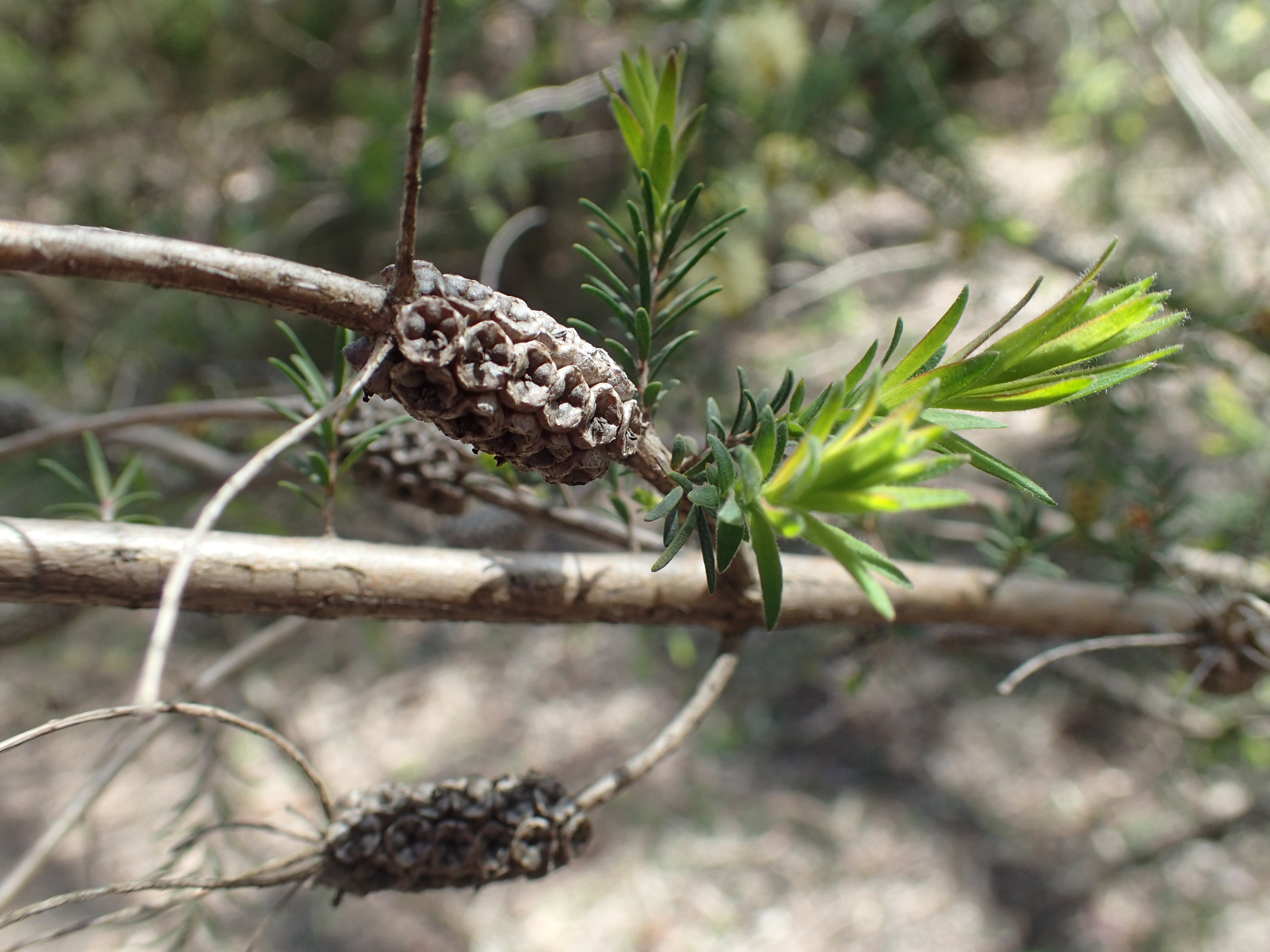
M. incana subsp. tenella fruit

== Taxonomy and naming ==
The species Melaleuca tenella had been originally described in 1867 in Flora Australiensis from a specimen collected by George Maxwell "in moist soil, tributaries of the Phillips River". In a review of the genus in 1998, Melaleuca tenella Benth. was reduced to the present subspecies. The subspecies name (tenella) is from the Latin tener meaning "soft", "delicate" or "tender", "in reference to the appearance of the type specimen of this plant".

== Distribution and habitat ==
Melaleuca incana subsp. tenella occurs near the coast of Western Australia between the Esperance district and Cape Arid in the Esperance Plains and Mallee biogeographic regions. It grows in sand in swampy sites.
