= Kalgan (disambiguation) =

Kalgan may refer to:

- Kalgan, Western Australia, a town
- Kalgan River, in Western Australia
- An earlier name for Zhangjiakou, in Hebei Province, China
- A name used by World Of Warcraft developer Tom Chilton (game developer)
- Kalgan (fictional planet)
