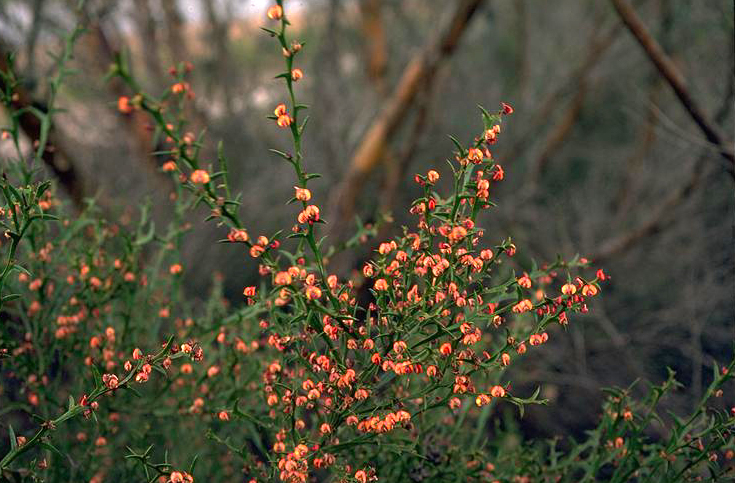
- Near Boxwood Hill

Scientific classification
- Kingdom: Plantae
- Clade: Tracheophytes
- Clade: Angiosperms
- Clade: Eudicots
- Clade: Rosids
- Order: Fabales
- Family: Fabaceae
- Subfamily: Faboideae
- Genus: Daviesia
- Species: D. decipiens

Binomial name
- Daviesia decipiens (E.Pritz.) Crisp

= Daviesia decipiens =

Species of flowering plant

Daviesia decipiens is a species of flowering plant in the family Fabaceae and is endemic to the south-west of Western Australia. It is an intricately branched shrub with scattered, sharply pointed oblong or tapering phyllodes, and orange, maroon and crimson flowers.

== Description ==
Daviesia decipiens is an intricately branched, glabrous shrub that typically grows to a height of up to 1.8 m (5 ft 11 in). Its leaves are reduced to scattered, sharply pointed oblong or tapering phyllodes 5–25 mm (0.20–0.98 in) long and 2–8 mm (0.079–0.315 in) wide. The flowers are arranged singly or in pairs in leaf axils on a peduncle 1.0–2.5 mm (0.039–0.098 in) long, each flower on a pedicel 0.75–1.5 mm (0.030–0.059 in) long with bracts about 0.5 mm (0.020 in) long at the base. The sepals are 3–4 mm (0.12–0.16 in) long and joined at the base, the two upper lobes forming a broad lip and the lower three triangular. The standard petal is elliptic, 5.0–6.5 mm (0.20–0.26 in) long, 5.5–8.0 mm (0.22–0.31 in) wide and orange with maroon markings, the wings 4.5–5.0 mm (0.18–0.20 in) long and red, and the keel 4.5–5.0 mm (0.18–0.20 in) long and crimson. Flowering occurs from June to September and the fruit is an inflated, triangular pod 11–12 mm (0.43–0.47 in) long.

== Taxonomy and naming ==
This daviesia was first formally described in 1904 by Ernst Georg Pritzel who gave it the name Daviesia pectinata var. decipiens in the Botanische Jahrbücher für Systematik, Pflanzengeschichte und Pflanzengeographie. In 1995, Michael Crisp raised the variety to species status as Daviesia decipiens. The specific epithet (decipiens) means "deceiving".

== Distribution and habitat ==
Daviesia decipiens grows in woodland, mallee and kwongan between Chidlow, Narrogin, Kalgan and Ravensthorpe in the Avon Wheatbelt, Esperance Plains, Jarrah Forest and Mallee biogeographic regions of south-western Western Australia.

== Conservation status ==
Daviesia decipiens is classified as "not threatened" by the Western Australian Government Department of Biodiversity, Conservation and Attractions.
