= Lower Kalgan Hall =

Building near Oyster Harbour, Western Australia

Coordinates: 34.9495°S 118.0024°E

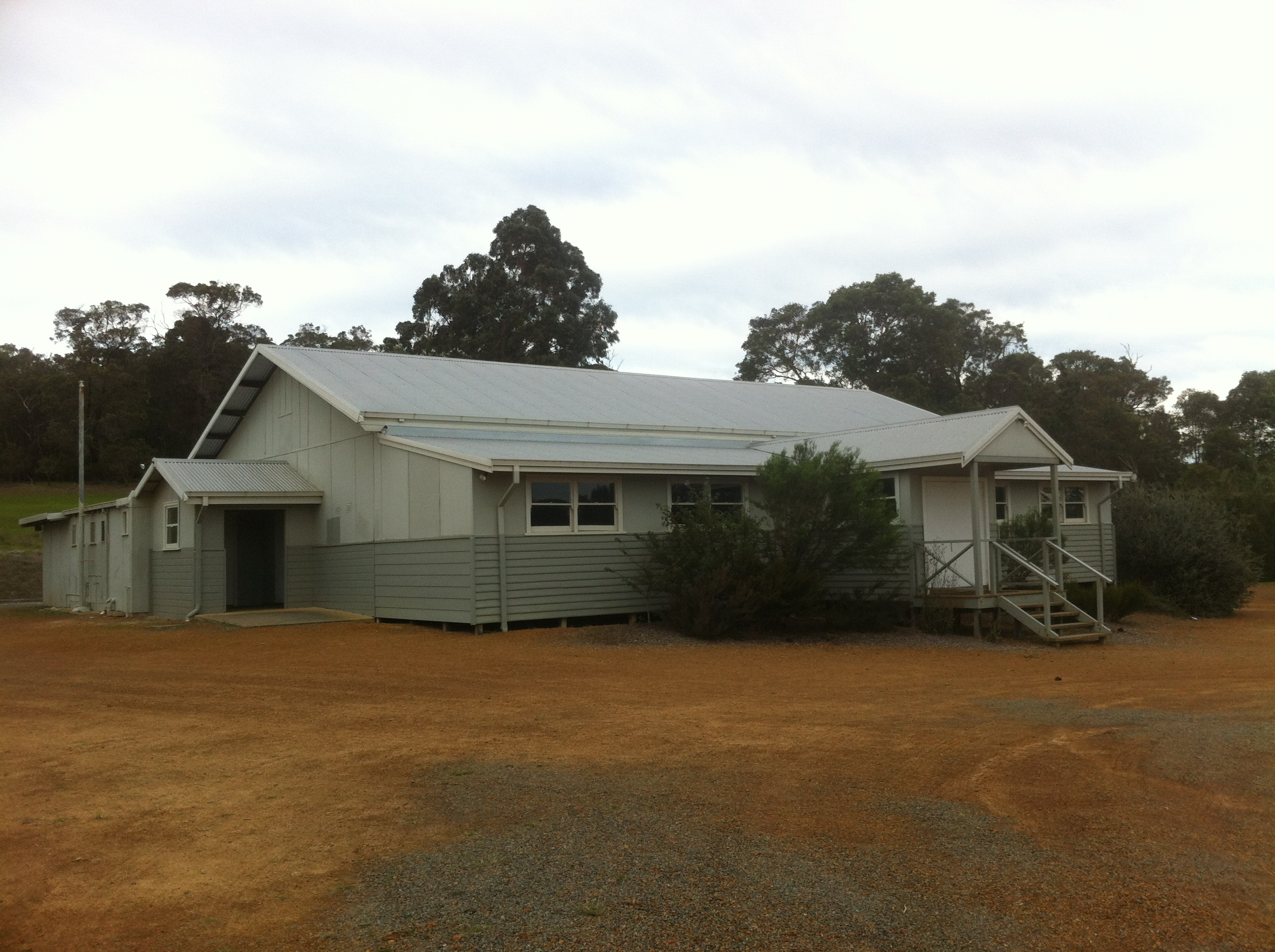
Lower Kalgan Hall

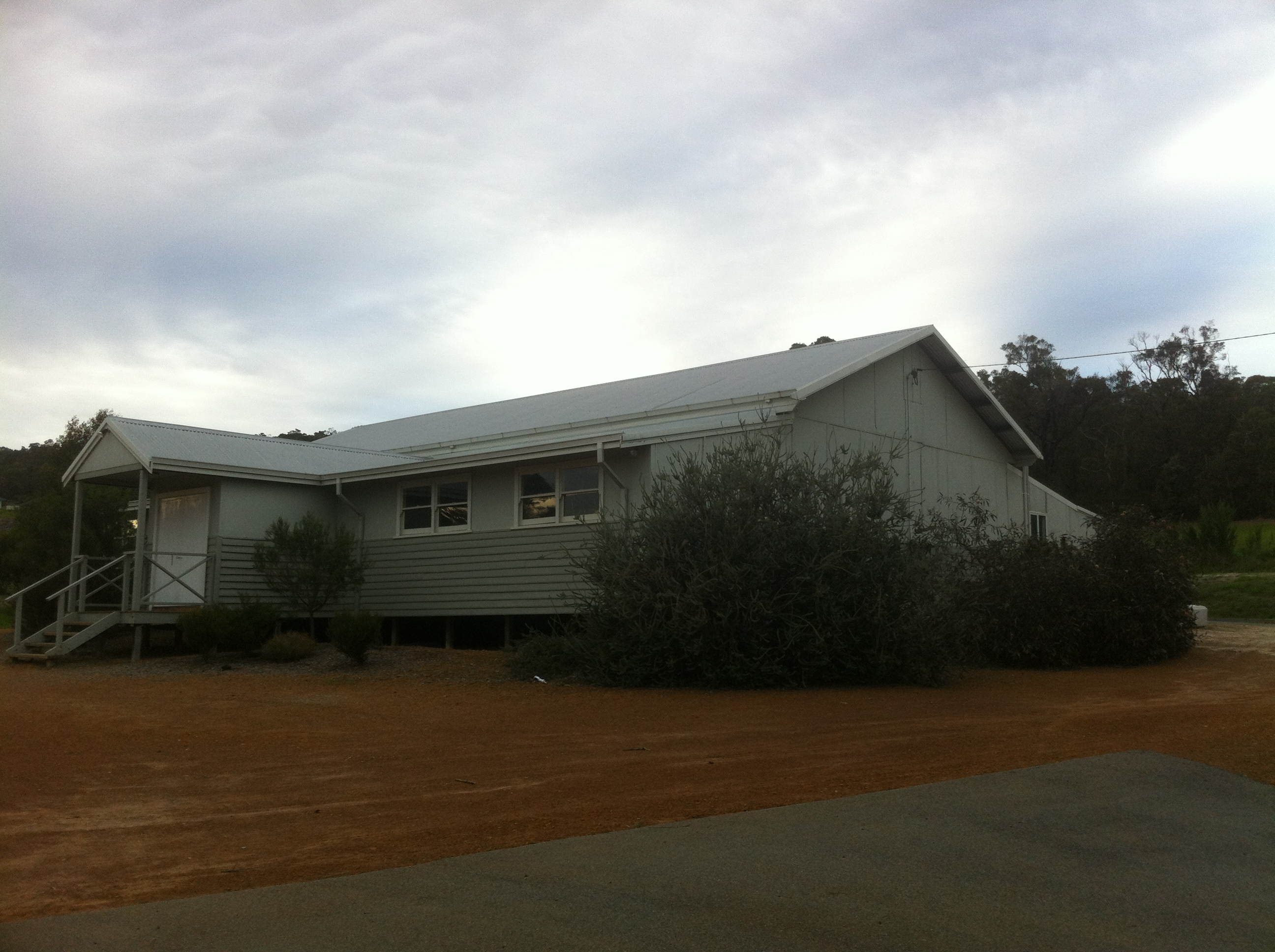
Lower Kalgan Hall north west corner

The Lower Kalgan Hall is a heritage listed building located on Nanarup Road not far from Oyster Harbour and the Kalgan River approximately 18 kilometres (11 mi) east of Albany in the Great Southern region of Western Australia.

The building is set in a large gravel parking area amongst farmland. The building is fibre board on a timber frame with a corrugated iron roof and has a gabled portico over the main entrance.

The current hall was built in 1954 to replace on older hall that had been the centre of the community for many years. The older hall no longer accommodated the growing population so it was replaced. Many of the building materials of the older hall were reused to build the kitchen in the existing hall. In 1998 the hall was renovated using funds from a grant, including repainting and stripping and resealing the floor boards.

== See also ==
- List of places on the State Register of Heritage Places in the City of Albany
