= Upper Kalgan Hall =

Archaeological site in Australia

Coordinates: 34.8939°S 118.0028°E

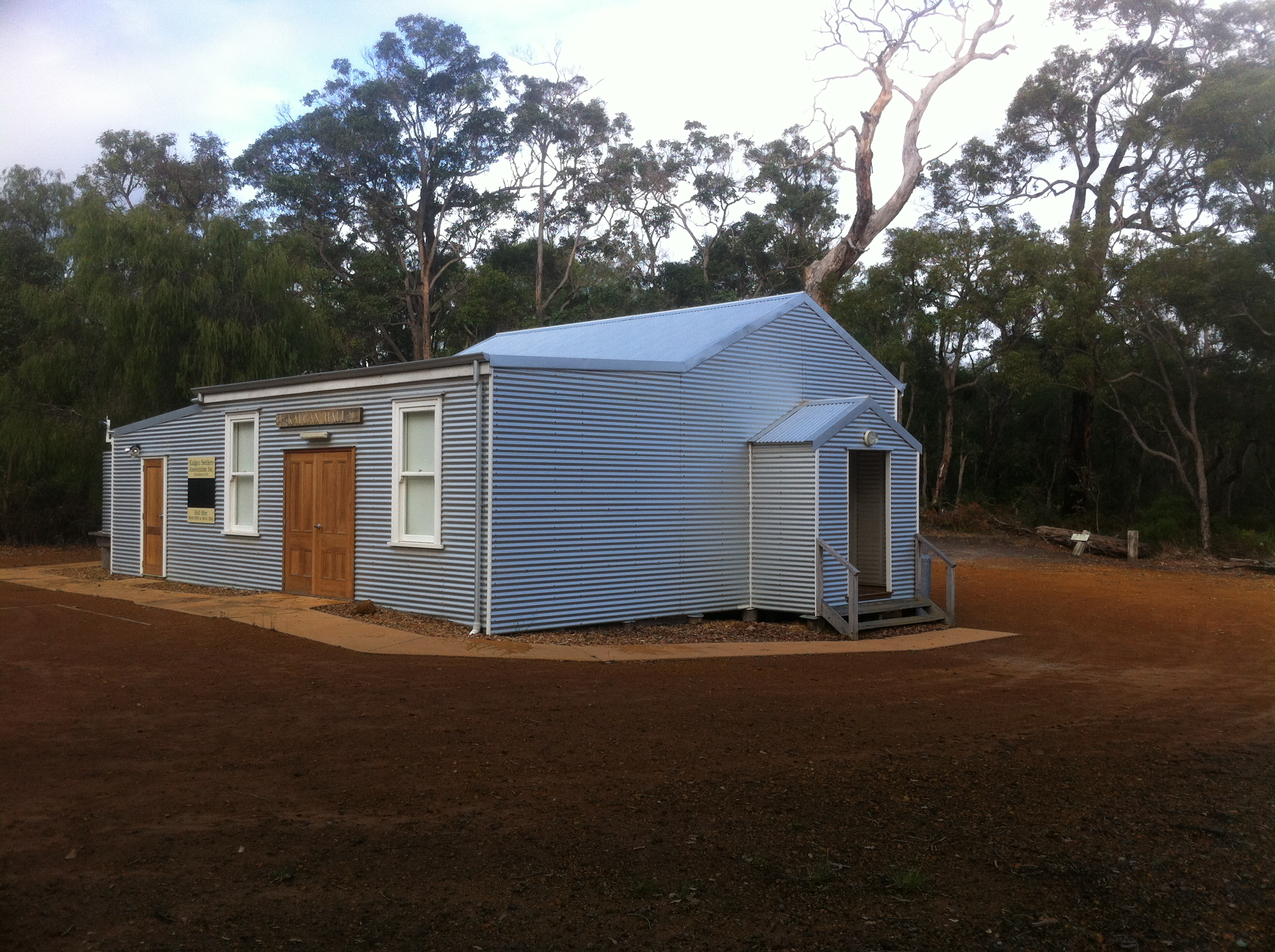
Eastern side of the hall in 2016

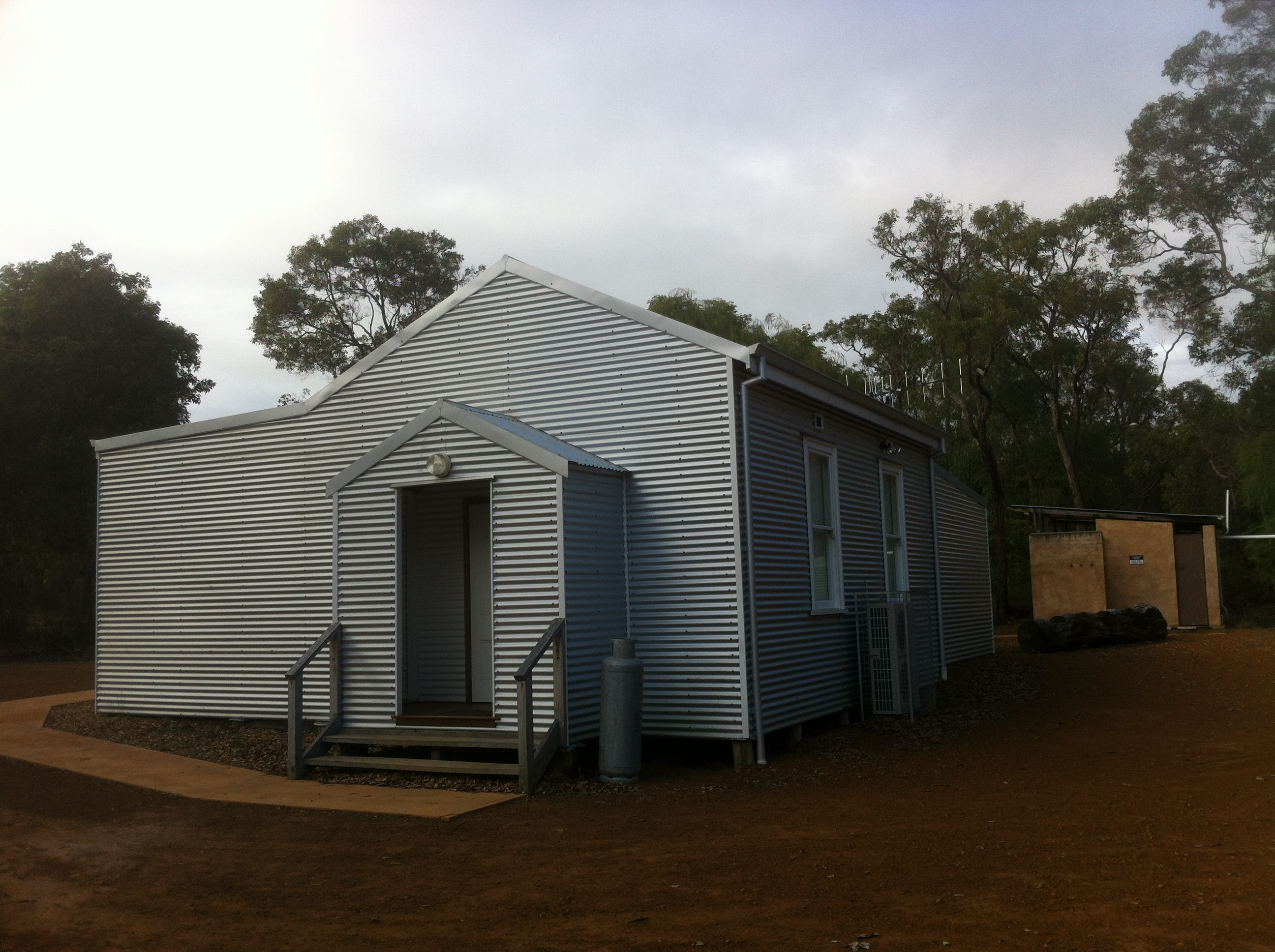
Hall entry

Upper Kalgan Hall is a heritage listed building and archaeological site located in Kalgan, close to the Kalgan River north east of Albany in the Great Southern region of Western Australia.

The hall is constructed from local timbers and corrugated iron and was completed in 1912. It is a single story rectangular building with a hipped corrugated iron roof and walls. The hall served the local community as a school, a church for travelling ministers, and a venue for social club meetings and dances.

The cost of the hall was £110 with the state government providing half the funds. The jarrah wood used to build the hall was cut and donated by Messrs James and Hill and was erected free of charge by Messrs Wiley and Allwood.

In 2008 plans were made to commence the restoration of the hall, to be completed in 2012 ready for the hall's centenary.

The site is archaeologically significant, revealing the earliest evidence of human habitation in the Albany region, and important to the local Mineng peoples who have inhabited the area for the last 20,000 years. In 1987 sites around the hall were excavated, yielding artefacts showing that the site was continuously inhabited by the Mineng peoples from 18,850 BC to the 1800s. The hall is close to a natural ford in the river with fish traps being located 500 metres (1,640 ft) downstream.

== See also ==
- List of places on the State Register of Heritage Places in the City of Albany
