= King River (Great Southern, Western Australia) =

River in Western Australia

Coordinates: 34°56′44.69″S 117°56′14.47″E

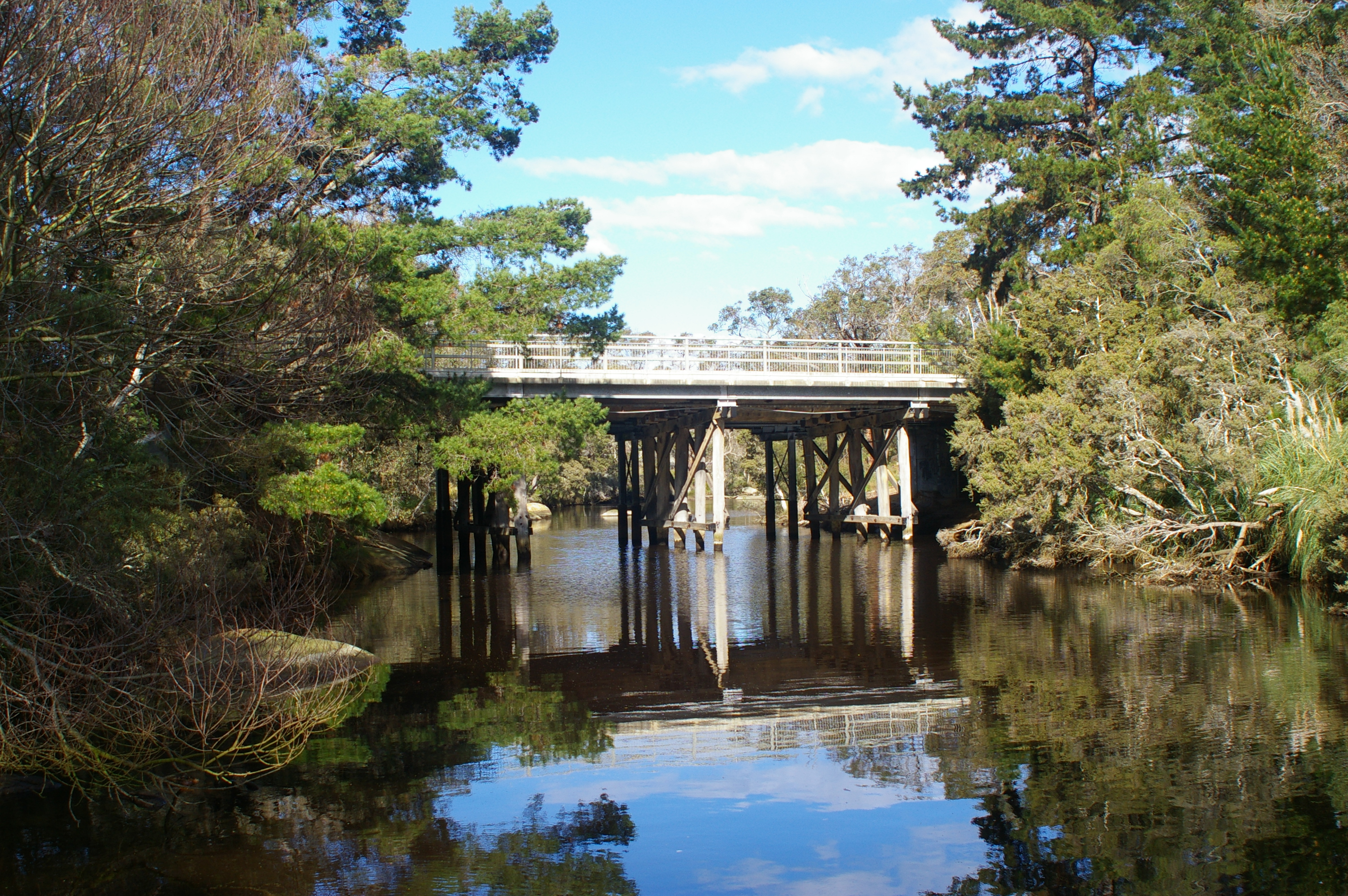
- Upper King River Bridge South Coast Highway near Albany, Western Australia

Location
- Country: Australia

Physical characteristics
- Source
  - location: East of Redmond
  - elevation: 72 metres (236 ft)
- Mouth
  - location: Oyster Harbour
  - elevation: sea level
- Length: 27 km (17 mi)
- Basin size: 402 km^{2} (155 sq mi)
- Discharge
  - average: 1.08 m^{3}/s (34,000 ML/a; 38 cu ft/s)

The King River is a river in the Great Southern region of Western Australia.

== Description ==
The river rises east of the town of Redmond and then flows for approximately 27 kilometres (17 mi) and along with the Kalgan River drains into Oyster Harbour and finally King George Sound north east of Albany.

The land along the river is estimated as being 83% cleared yet the water quality is generally healthy fresh water. The salinity level of the King River at discharge is 800 mg/L.

== History ==
The river was named after an early explorer of the Australian and Patagonian coasts, Phillip Parker King, by Thomas Braidwood Wilson while exploring the region in December 1829. The estuarine zone of the river is from the mouth to 7 kilometres (4 mi) upstream to where Mill Brook joins the river.

The area around Lower King was a known haunt for sealers in 1831. It was settled later in the 1830s but the townsite was not gazetted until 1959.

The Lower King River Bridge was constructed in 1898 and washed away during a storm in 1900. Both the upper and lower bridges were damaged during storms in 1902. In 1944 and 1947 parts of the lower bridge collapsed and rebuilt.

In January 2019 the Upper King Bridge was burned by a deliberately lit fire causing A$300,000 in damage.

== Tributaries ==
The main tributary of the King River is Mill Brook which joins the King about 2 kilometres (1.2 mi) north-west of the Upper King Bridge.
