= Albany Fish Traps =

Fish traps in Western Australia

Coordinates: 34°56′52.4″S 117°57′38.6″E

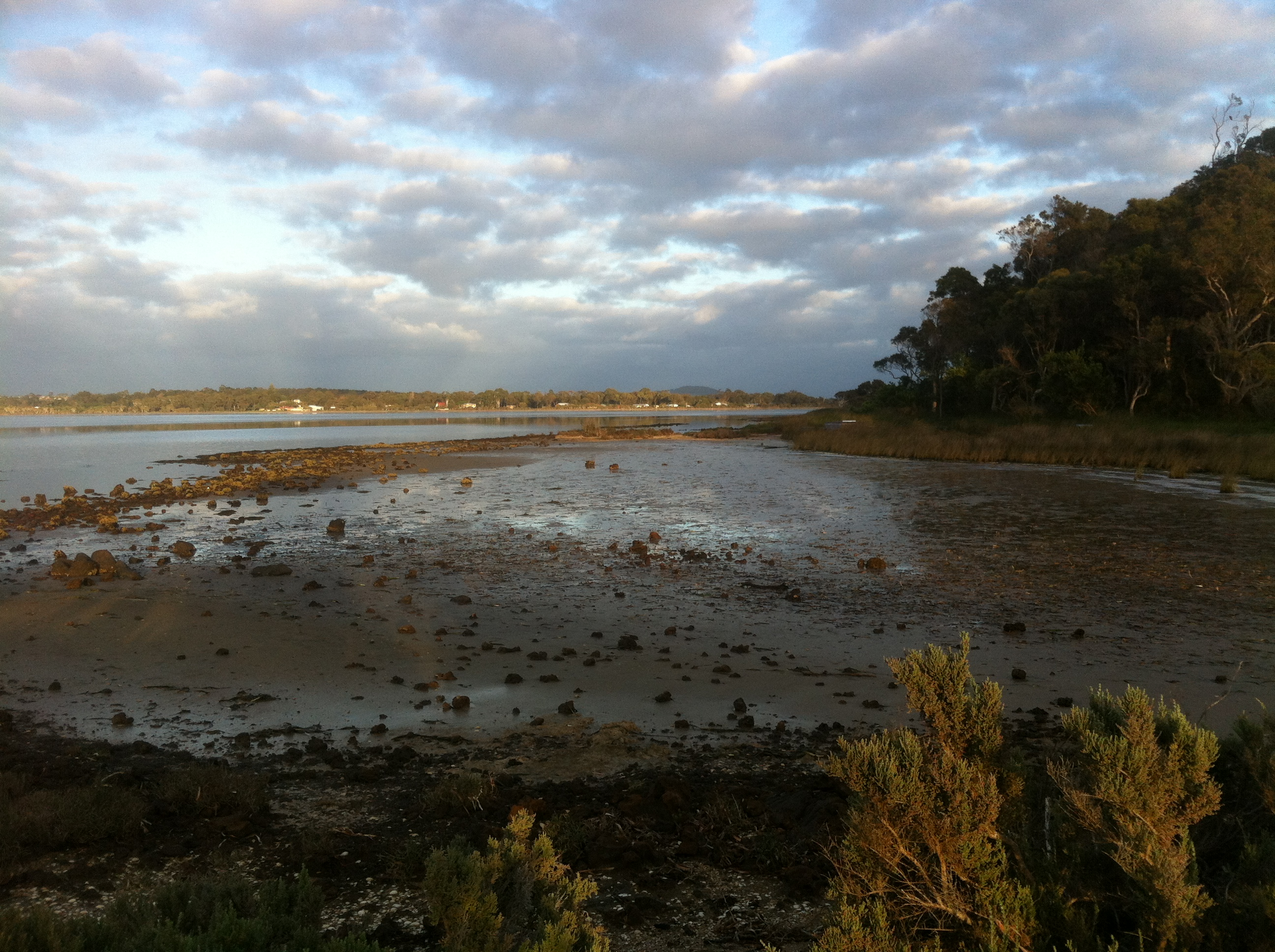
Southern end of Albany Fish Traps at low tide

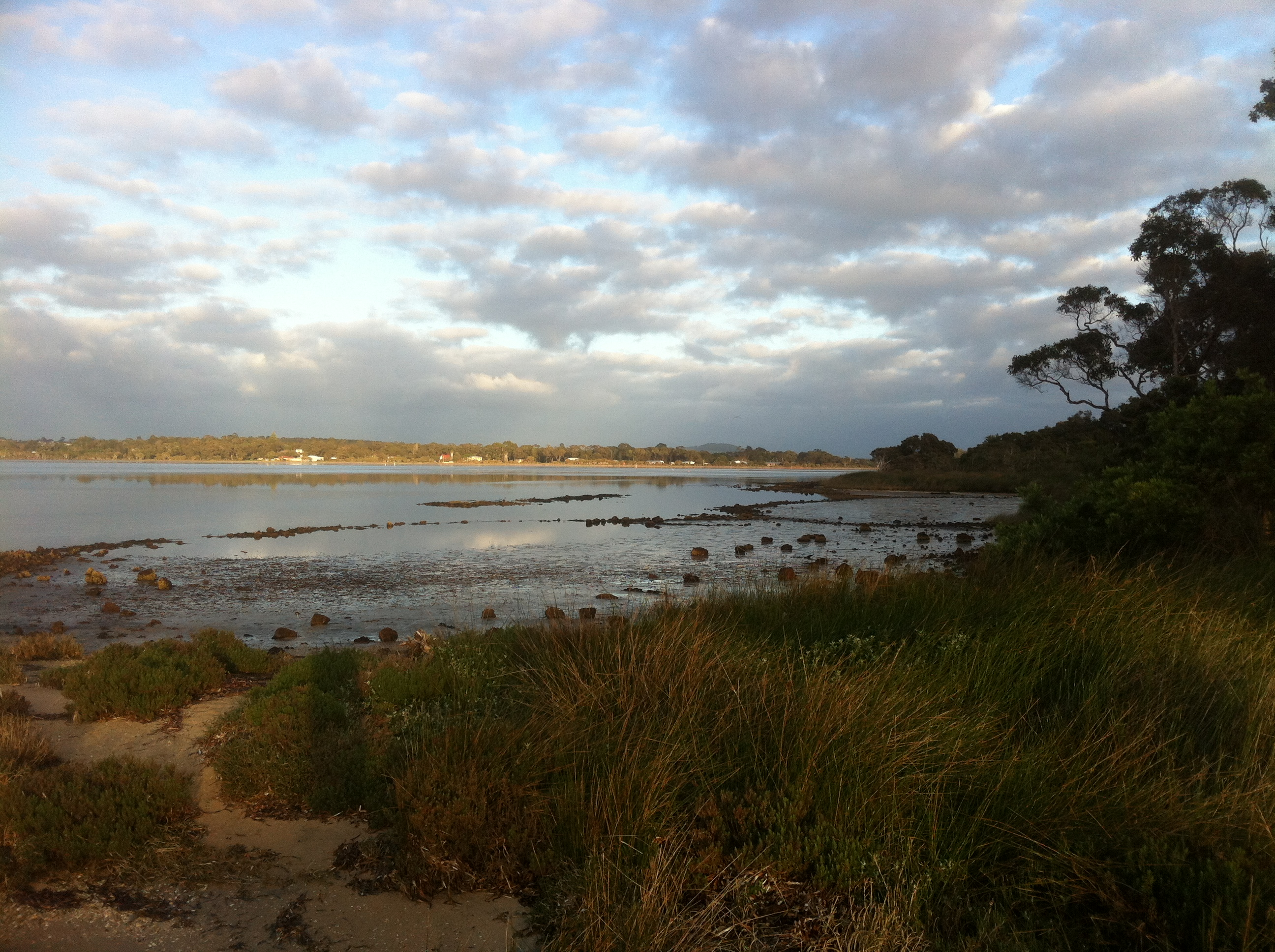
Northern end of fish traps

The Albany Fish Traps, also known as the Oyster Harbour Fish Traps, are a series of fish traps situated in Oyster Harbour near the mouth of the Kalgan River approximately 14 kilometres (9 mi) east of Albany in the Great Southern region of Western Australia.

The traps were constructed by the Menang peoples and are over 7,500 years old. The area is sacred to the Menang and was once a corroboree area that was mostly used during the warmer months. The low loose stone walls of the traps are on the northern shore of Oyster Harbour and are back by a steep hill. As the tide moved the fish would be stranded inside the courses of the stones, which were topped with brush, then collected at low tide.

Arranged in a crescent shape the traps are composed of eight separate weirs each consisting of thousands of stones. The area occupies an area of approximately 800 square metres (8,611 sq ft); excavation of a 1 metre (3 ft) section revealed 80 stones were used in that section.

Only visible at low tide the traps were described by George Vancouver in 1791. Nicolas Baudin described the traps during his expedition of 1803 as did Philip Parker King in 1818. All of the stones used in the traps are dark, almost black, lateritic material found naturally on the shoreline.

The site was vested in the National Trust in the 1966, and was in the first group of sites to be declared as Protected Areas under the Aboriginal Heritage Act 1972 when they were gazetted in 1973.

At the request of the traditional owners a series of minor excavations were carried out by archeologists from 2000 to 2006.

The site was returned to the Menang people through the Albany Heritage Reference Group Aboriginal Corporation in a ceremony in 2009.

Following the discovery in 2011 that hundreds of the stones had been removed, a A$170,000 project was initiated to construct a cultural shelter, boardwalk and interpretation signs adjacent to the traps. The project was completed and opened in 2015.

== See also ==
- List of places on the State Register of Heritage Places in the City of Albany
