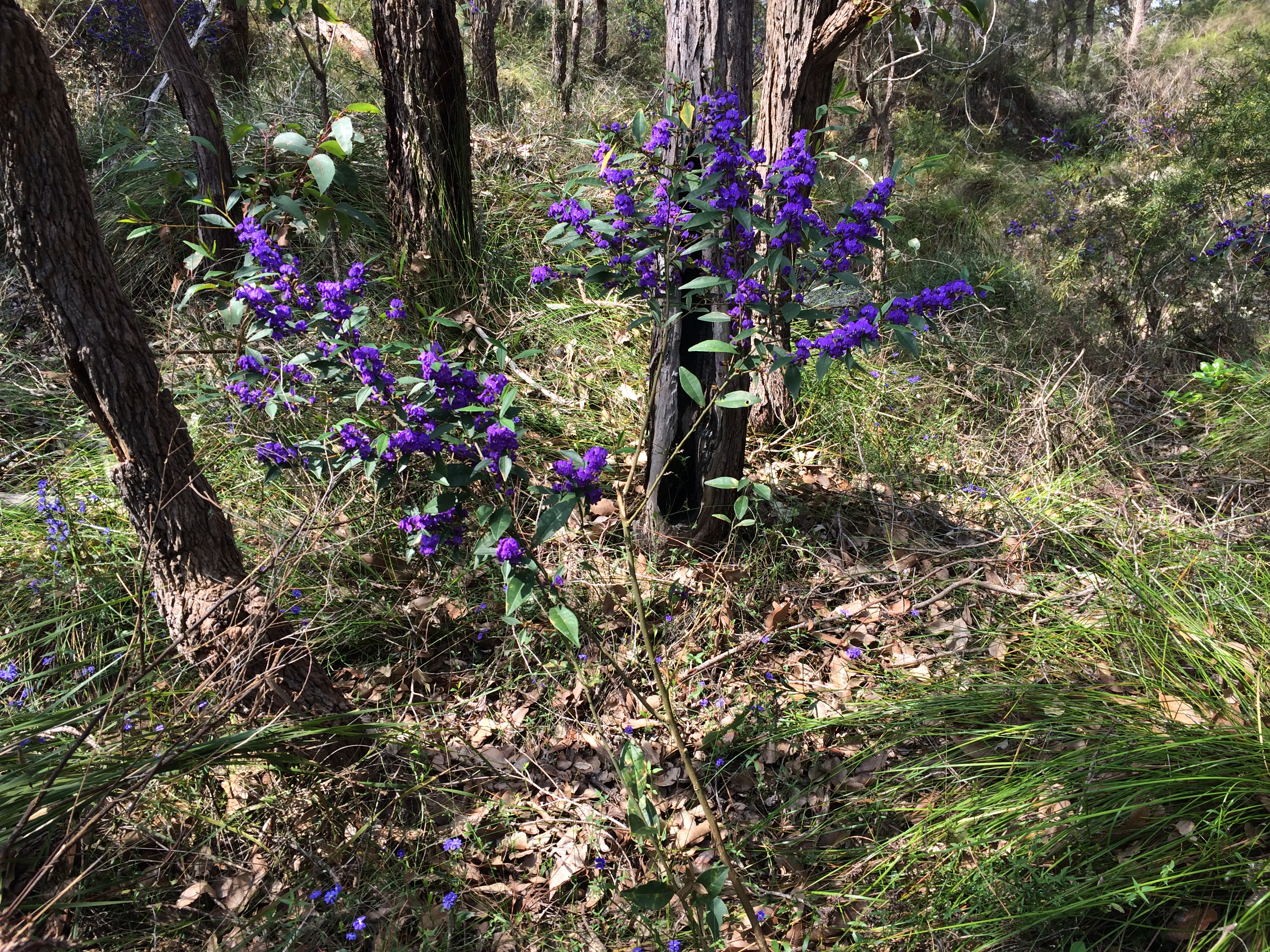

Scientific classification
- Kingdom: Plantae
- Clade: Embryophytes
- Clade: Tracheophytes
- Clade: Angiosperms
- Clade: Eudicots
- Clade: Rosids
- Order: Fabales
- Family: Fabaceae
- Subfamily: Faboideae
- Genus: Hovea
- Species: H. elliptica

Binomial name
- Hovea elliptica (Sm.) DC.

Synonyms
- Goodia simplicifolia Spreng.; Hovea celsi Bonpl. orth. var.; Hovea celsii Bonpl.; Phusicarpos elliptica Poir. orth. var.; Phusicarpos ellipticus (Sm.) Poir.; Platychilum celsianum Laun.; Poiretia elliptica Sm. nom. illeg.

= Hovea elliptica =

Species of legume

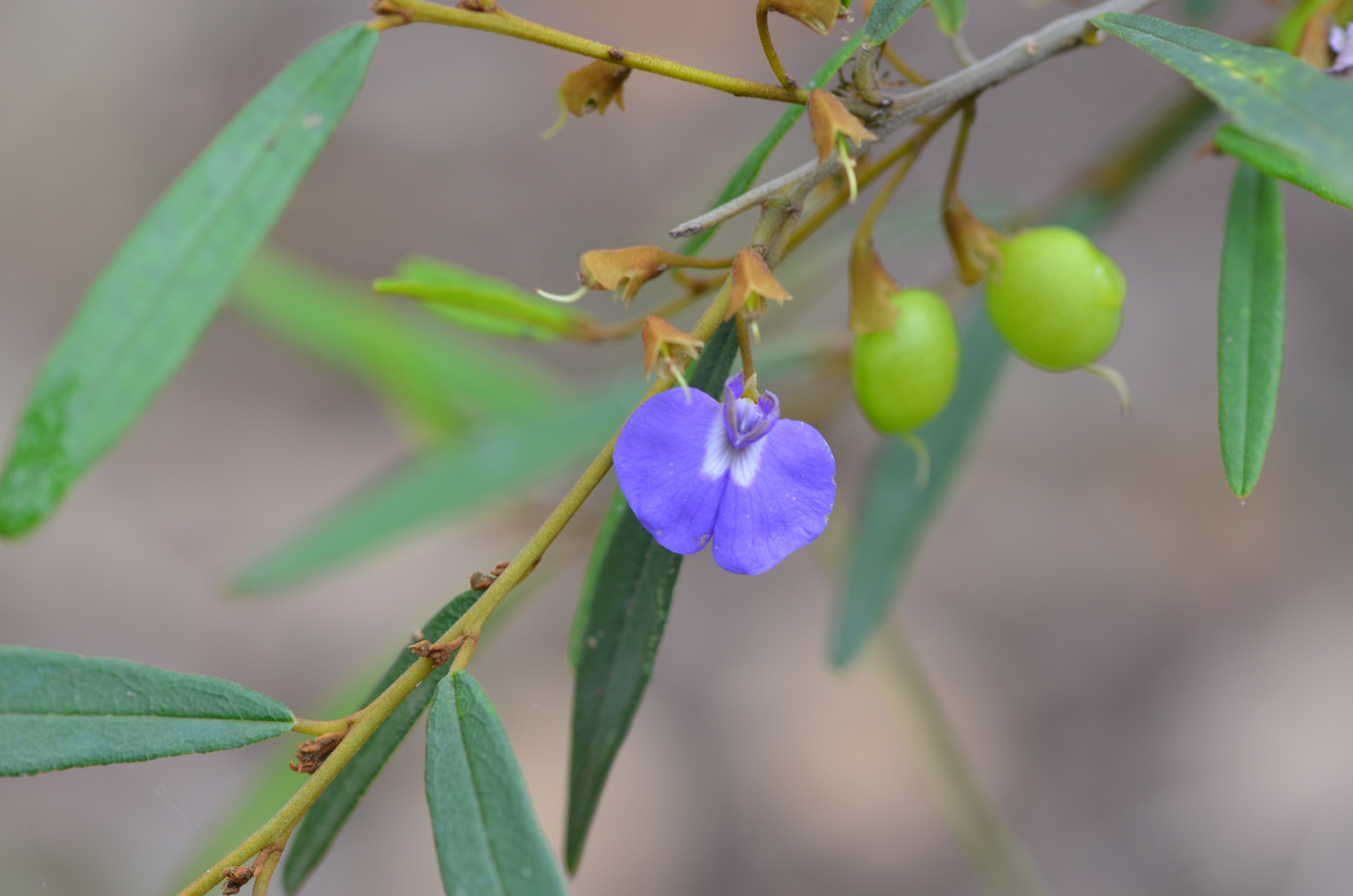
Hovea elliptica foliage, flowers and fruit

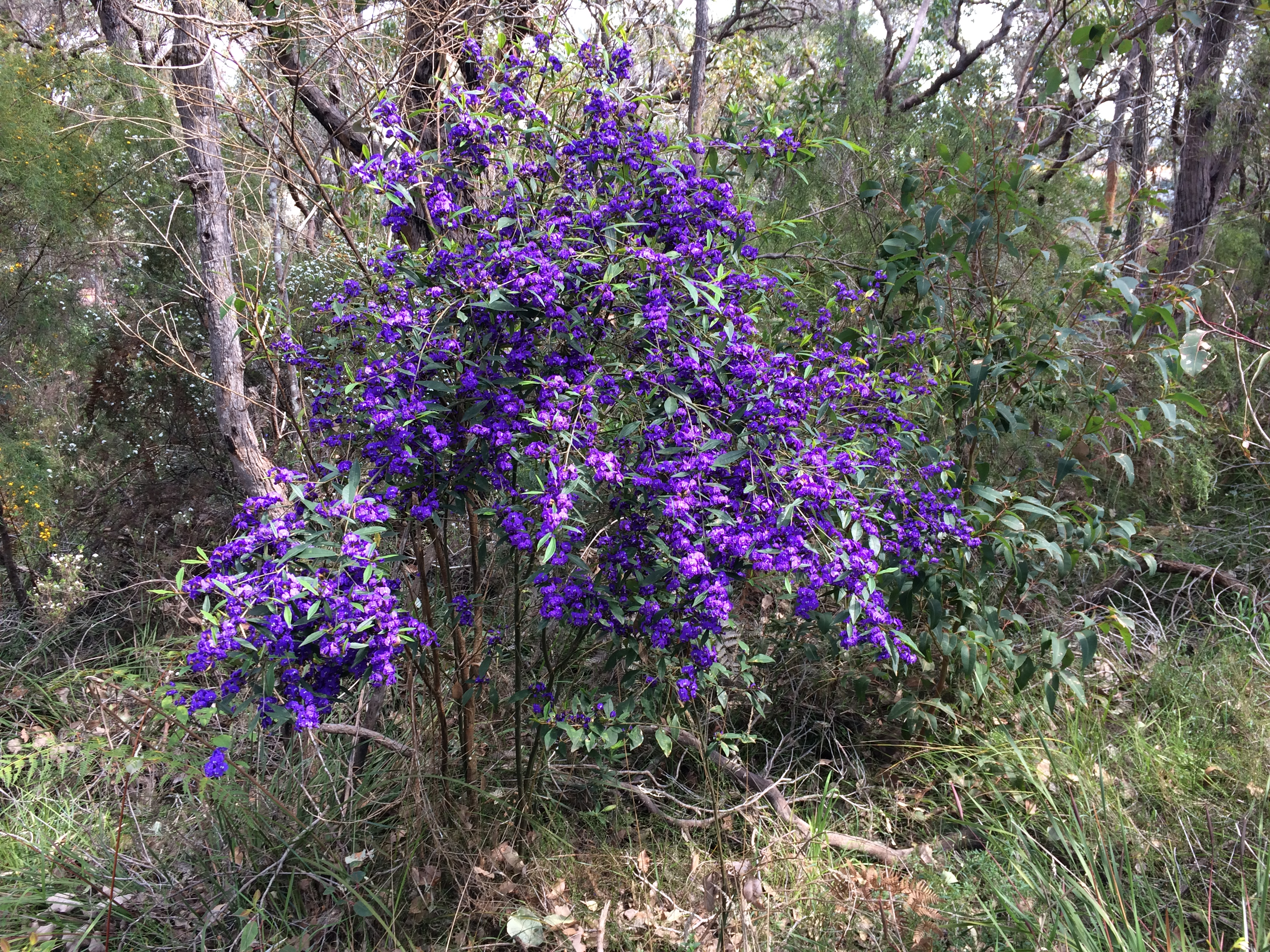
Hovea elliptica in jarrah forest in Albany, Western Australia

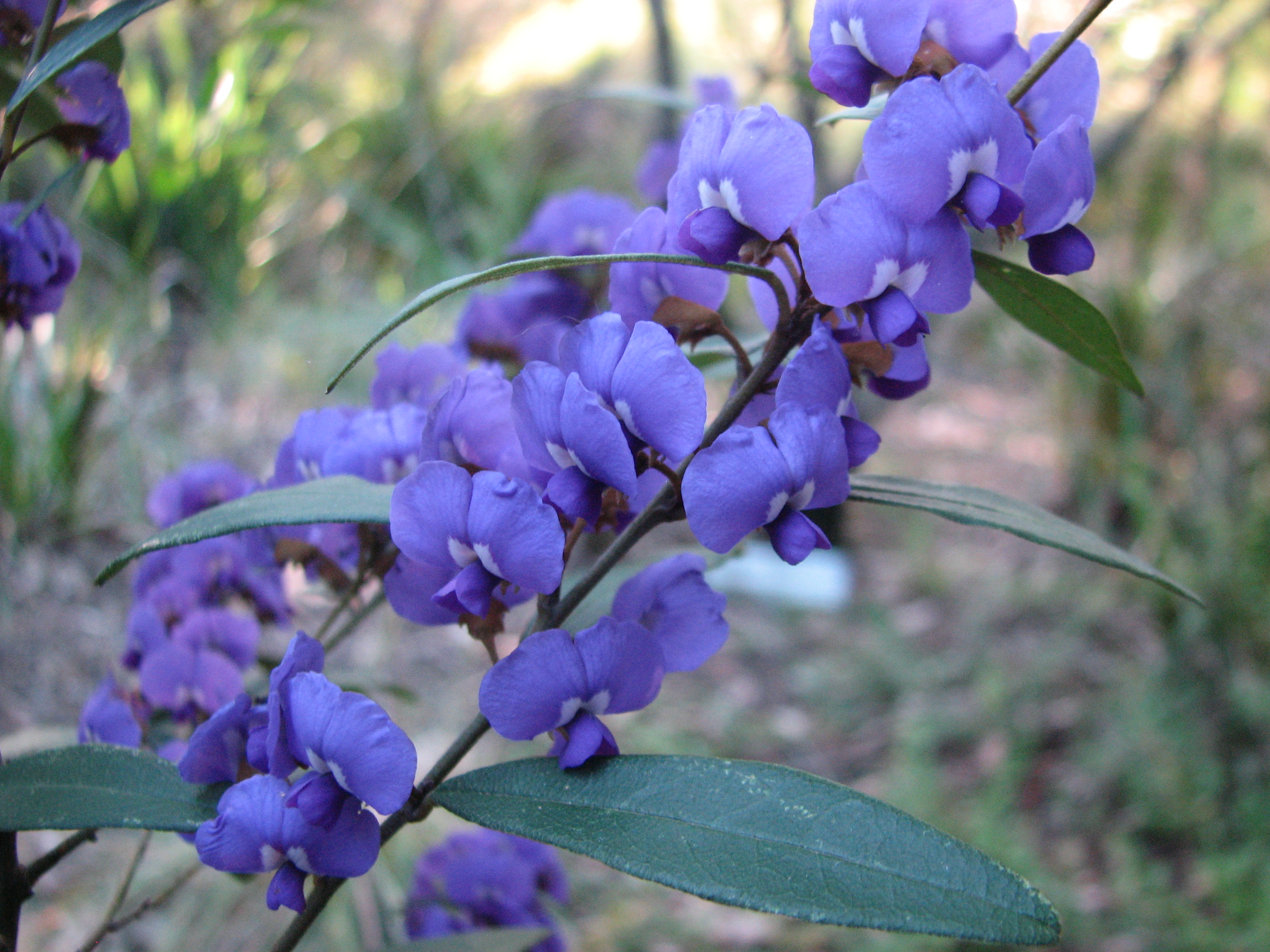
Hovea ellptica flowers

Hovea elliptica, commonly known as the tree hovea or karri blue bush, is an ornamental plant in the family Fabaceae that is native to Western Australia. This plant was cited as Hovea Celsi in Description des plantes rares cultivees a Malmaison et a Navarre by Aimé Jacques Alexandre Bonpland.

== Description ==
The erect and slender shrub or small tree typically grows to a height of 0.4 to 3 metres (1 to 10 ft). It is usually single stemmed and the young branches are covered in spreading often rust coloured hairs. The stipules are narrow triangular and around 1 millimetre (0.039 in) in length. The alternately arranged leaves have an elliptical blade to around 7.5 centimetres (3.0 in) in length. The species has purple or blue flowers that appear between August and December in its native range. The pea-shaped flowers are arranged in short clusters among the leaf axils. The axillary inflorescences contain one to seven flowers. The seed pods that form later are ovoid to ellipsoid in shape and are 0.8 to 1.2 cm (0.31 to 0.47 in) in length and 0.8 to 1.3 cm (0.31 to 0.51 in) wide. The olive brown seeds within have an elliptic shape and 3.8 to 5.1 mm (0.15 to 0.20 in) in length and 2.8 to 3.1 mm (0.11 to 0.12 in) wide.

== Taxonomy ==
The species was first formally described in 1808 as Poiretia elliptica by James Edward Smith in the Transactions of the Linnean Society of London from specimens collected from King George's Sound by Archibald Menzies. It was later transferred to the genus Hovea in 1825 by Augustin Pyramus de Candolle in his Prodromus Systematis Naturalis Regni Vegetabilis.

== Distribution ==
It occurs on sand dunes, slopes ridges and granite outcrops in the South West and Great Southern regions of Western Australia where it grows in clay, loamy, sandy and gravelly lateritic soils often rich in organic matter. Usually part of the understorey in jarrah, marri and karri forest communities and is often associated with Bossiaea aquifolium subsp. laidlawiana and Hovea chorizemifolia.

== Use in horticulture ==
It is sold commercially as seedlings or in seed form, the seeds germinate readily but it may help to scarify or pre-treat with boiling water. The plant prefers well-drained soils and an open sunny or partly shaded position. It is drought tolerant but frost tender.
