= Government Jetty, Albany =

Heritage listed jetty in Albany, Western Australia

Coordinates: 34.9488°S 117.9772°E

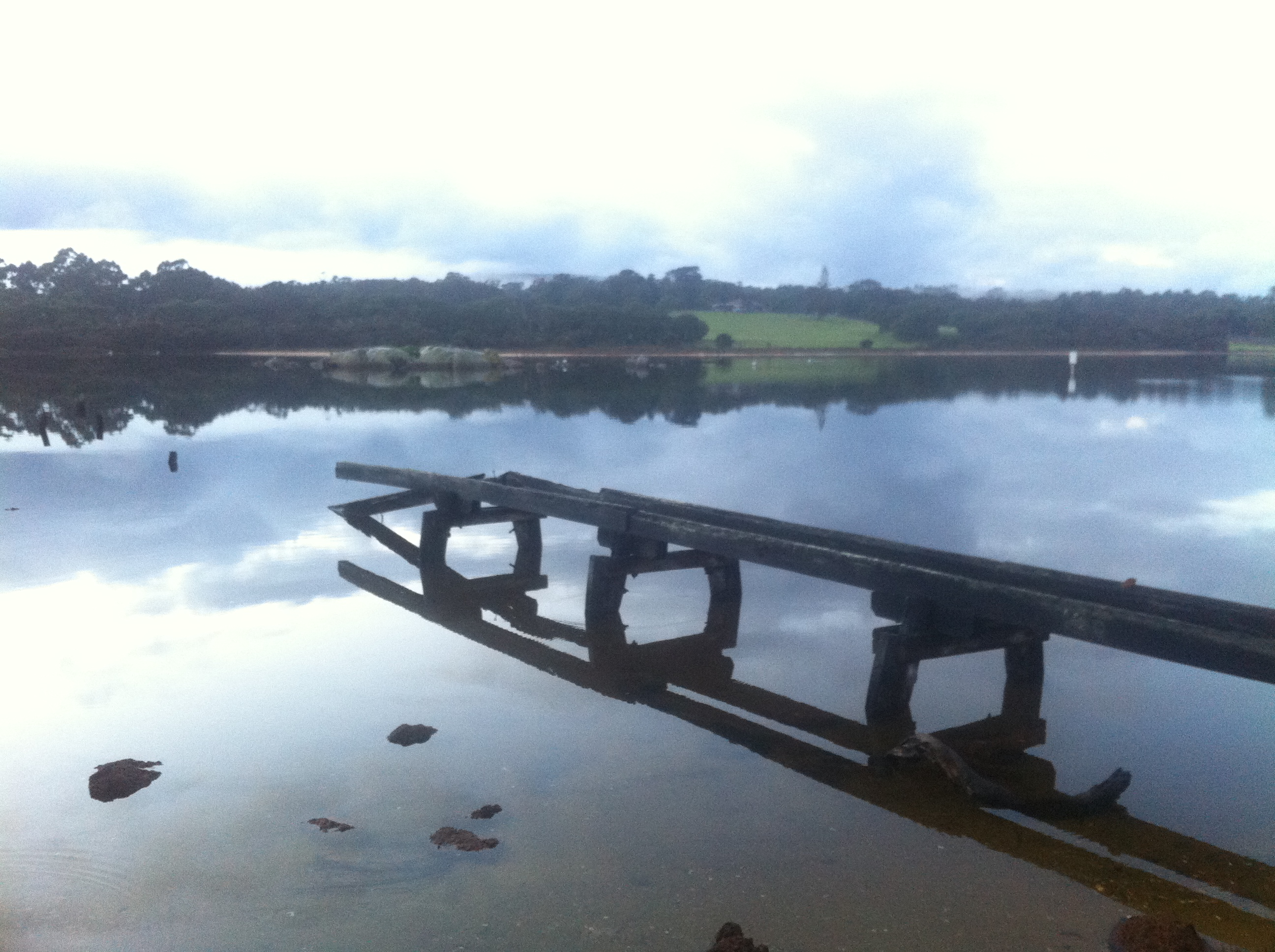
Government Jetty looking out to Oyster Harbour

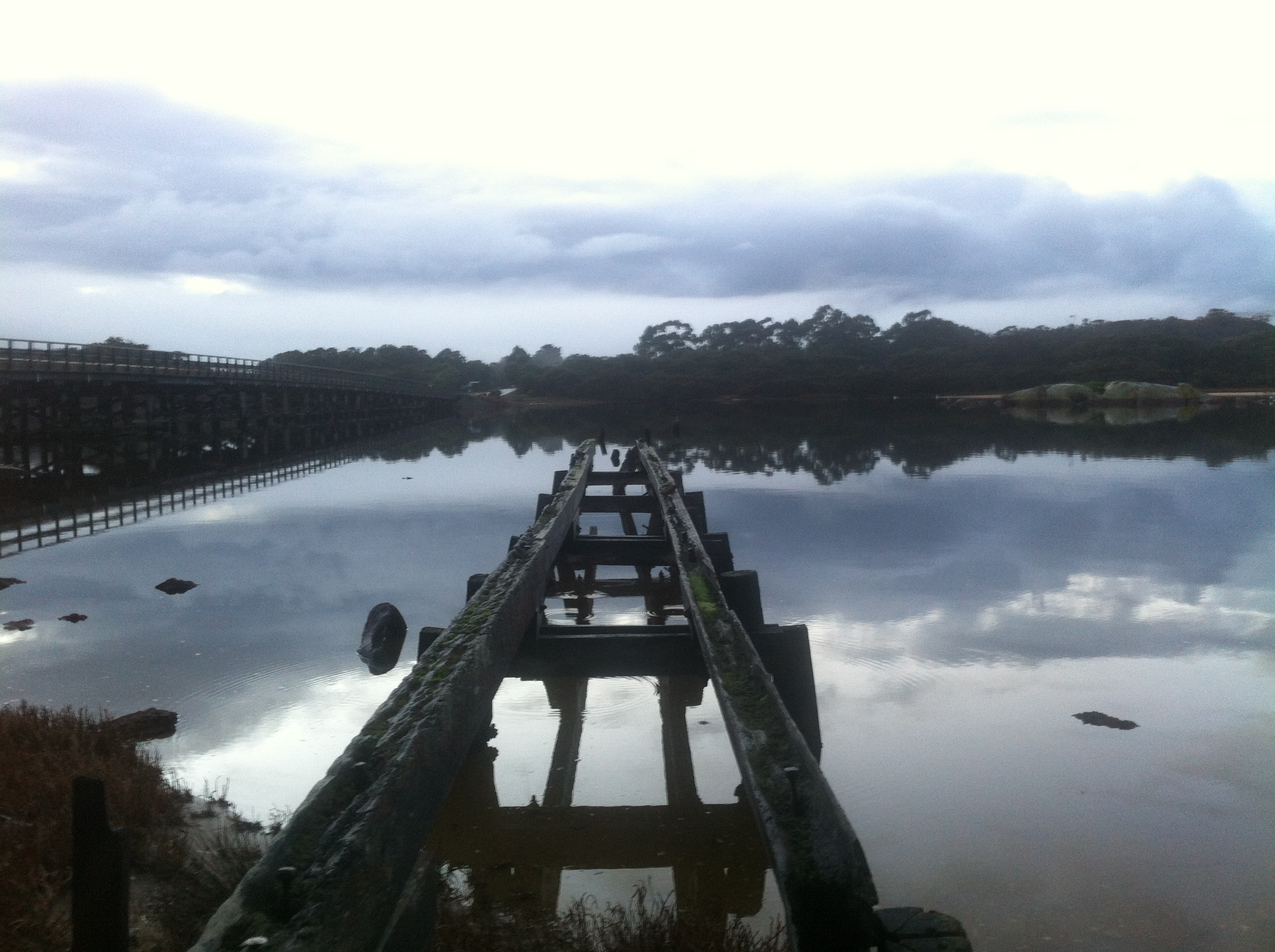
Government Jetty with Lower Kalgan Bridge to the left

Government Jetty, also known as the Kalgan River Jetty or the Fruit Landing, is a heritage listed structure located on Nanarup Road on the Kalgan River near Albany in the Great Southern region of Western Australia.

The jetty was built from 1906 to 1908 and is representative of the development of the Lower Kalgan Bridge. The jetty was intended as a berthing spot for lighters to off‑load goods for the district's new settlers. It was later used as a delivery point for timber used to build the bridge. The jetty once had rail lines on it so that a trolley could be used to transfer materials from the barges delivered them from upriver. It was also used to land equipment such as wooden stave and cast iron pipes, for the construction of the town water supply line from Two Peoples Bay in 1914.

The jetty was also used by tourist vessels, Messrs Armstrong and Waters used it to tie up their steamer, Silver Star, after her run from Albany boarded with sightseers. From there two motor launches took the passengers further up the river to Killarney.

The finger jetty had a T-shaped head was constructed using timber pylons and decking with iron fastenings. It is currently in a poor condition with the last 10 metres (33 ft) having been lost apart from parts of two pylons.

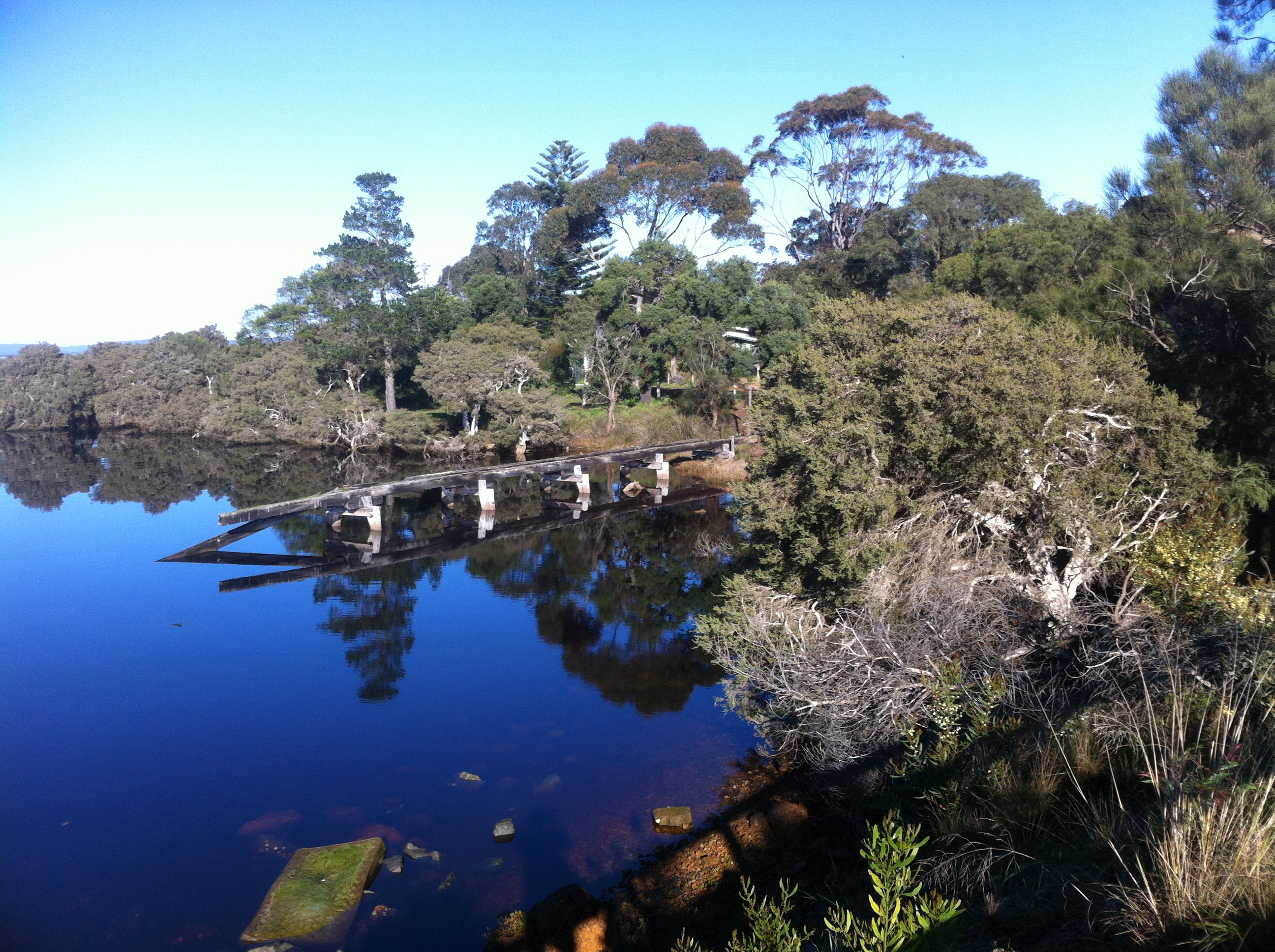
Government Jetty from Lower Kalgan Bridge

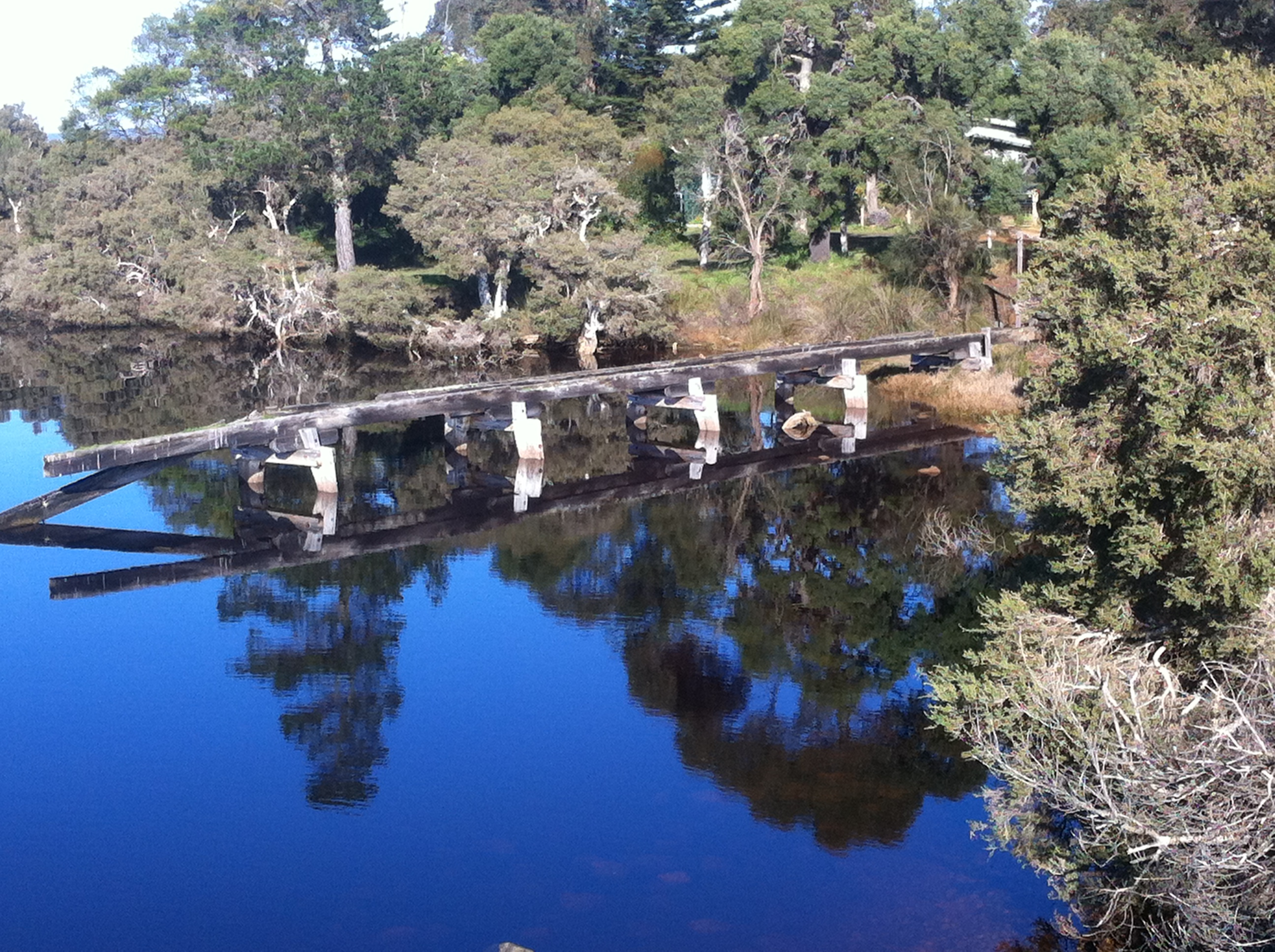
Government Jetty

== See also ==
- List of places on the State Register of Heritage Places in the City of Albany
