= Kalgan, Western Australia =

Town in the City of Albany, Western Australia

Kalgan
- Town
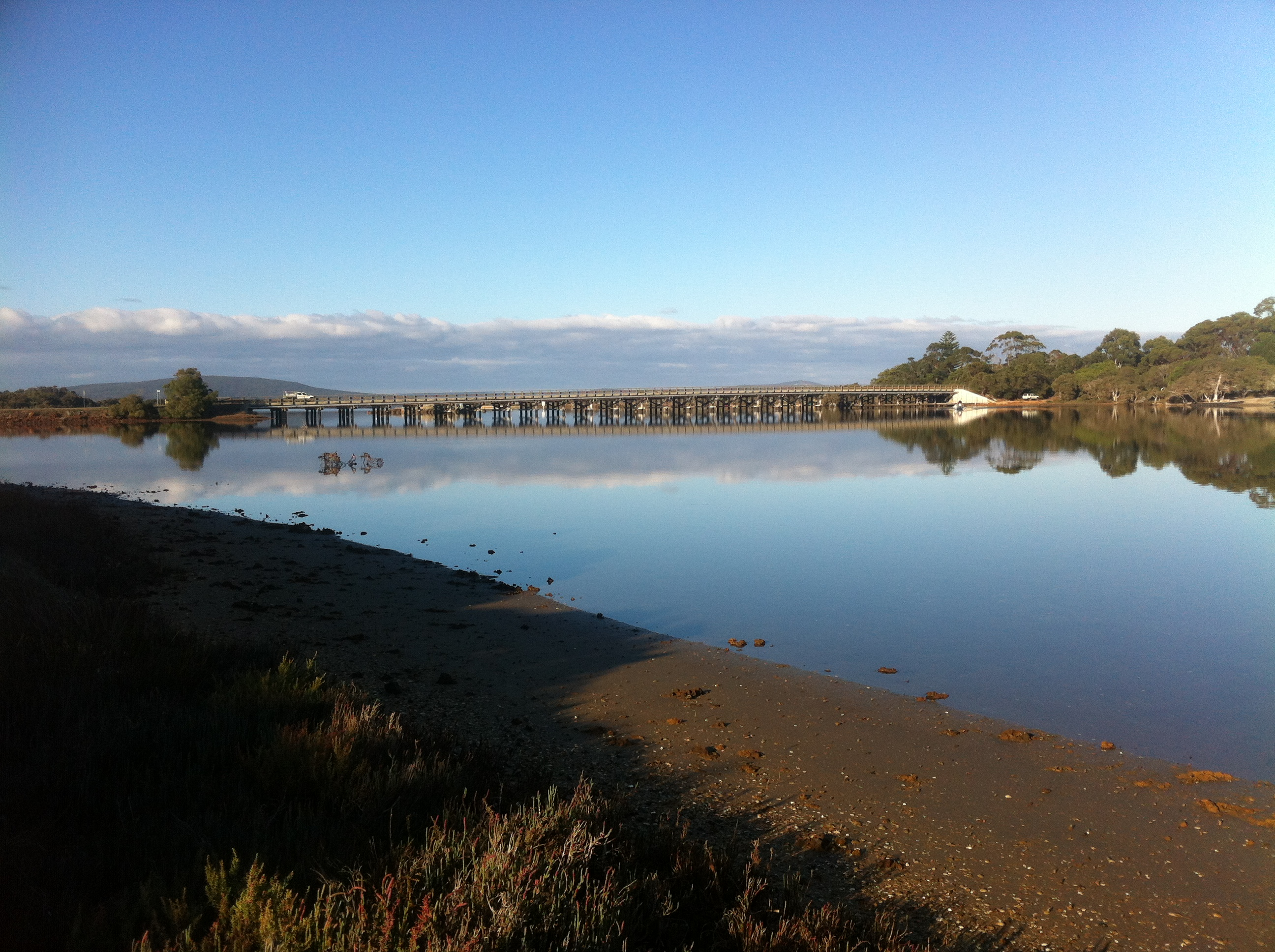
- The Lower Kalgan bridge at Kalgan from east bank

- Coordinates: 34°56′53″S 118°0′46″E
- Country: Australia
- State: Western Australia
- LGA: City of Albany
- Location: 388 km (241 mi) south east of Perth; 17 km (11 mi) north east of Albany; 42 km (26 mi) south east of Mount Barker
- Established: 1912

Government
  - State electorate: Albany
  - Federal division: O'Connor

Area
  - Total: 250 km^{2} (97 sq mi)
- Elevation: 32 m (105 ft)

Population
  - Total: 840 (SAL 2021)
- Postcode: 6330

Kalgan is a small town and locality of the City of Albany in the Great Southern region of Western Australia. The South Coast Highway runs through the locality from west to east. The western part of Gull Rock National Park is located within Kalgan. The town is situated on the banks of the Kalgan River and was first known as Kalganup which means "place of first camp" or "place of many waters". Indigenous Australians used the area as a meeting place up to 19,000 years ago. The name was first recorded in 1831, when explorer Alexander Collie charted the area.

Land was set aside for a townsite in 1837 and was sparsely settled, with approximately a dozen people living in the area in 1900.

The town was gazetted in 1912 following land being opened up in the area. The Upper Kalgan Hall was constructed in 1912 and became a focal point for the community. By 1913, the population was approximately 150 people.

The Lower Kalgan Hall was constructed in 1954. Both the lower and Upper Halls are on the Heritage Council of Western Australia listed places.

An independent school, Great Southern Grammar, was built along Oyster Harbour near where the Kalgan River discharges into the harbour. The school was established in 1999 and is the only school in Kalgan.
