= Luke Pen =

Australian biologist

Luke J Pen (1960–2002) was a biologist and environmental scientist in Western Australia.

He researched and wrote about rivers and their biology and management, in South West, Western Australia.

A memorial walk path on the Kalgan River commemorates his efforts and work to raise interest and knowledge in local rivers.

In 2008 a memorial scholarship in his name was created to support students of riverine environments in their research.

== Select publications ==
- Brock, Margaret A; Pen, Luke J; Canning (W.A.). Council; Brock, Margaret A (1984), Ecological studies of the Canning River Wetland, City of Canning, ISBN 978-0-9598148-3-5
- Pen, Luke J; Murdoch University. School of Biological and Environmental Sciences (1990), The biology of four species of native and two species of introduced fish in south-western Australia
- Pen, L.J; Potter, I.C (1991), Biology of the western pygmy perch, Edelia vittata, and comparisons with two other teleost species endemic to south-western Australia, Kluwer Academic Publishers
- Pen, Luke J; Swan River Trust (W.A.) (1993), Fringing vegetation of the Canning, Southern and Wungong Rivers : report to the Swan River Trust, The Trust, ISBN 978-0-7309-5468-2
- Pen, Luke J; Majer, Karen; Western Australia. Waterways Commission; Pen, Luke; Majer, Karen (1993), Living streams : a guide to bringing watercourses back to life in south-west Western Australia, Waterways Commission, ISBN 978-0-7309-5555-9, ISSN 1320-2642
- Williams, P. J; Pen, Luke J (1995), Wild rivers project : Kimberley region pilot verification study : a report to The Australian Heritage Commission, Water Resources Planning Branch, Water Resources Division, Water Authority of Western Australia
