= Oyster Harbour, Western Australia =

Estuary in Western Australia

Oyster Harbour
- Miaritch (Menang Noongar)
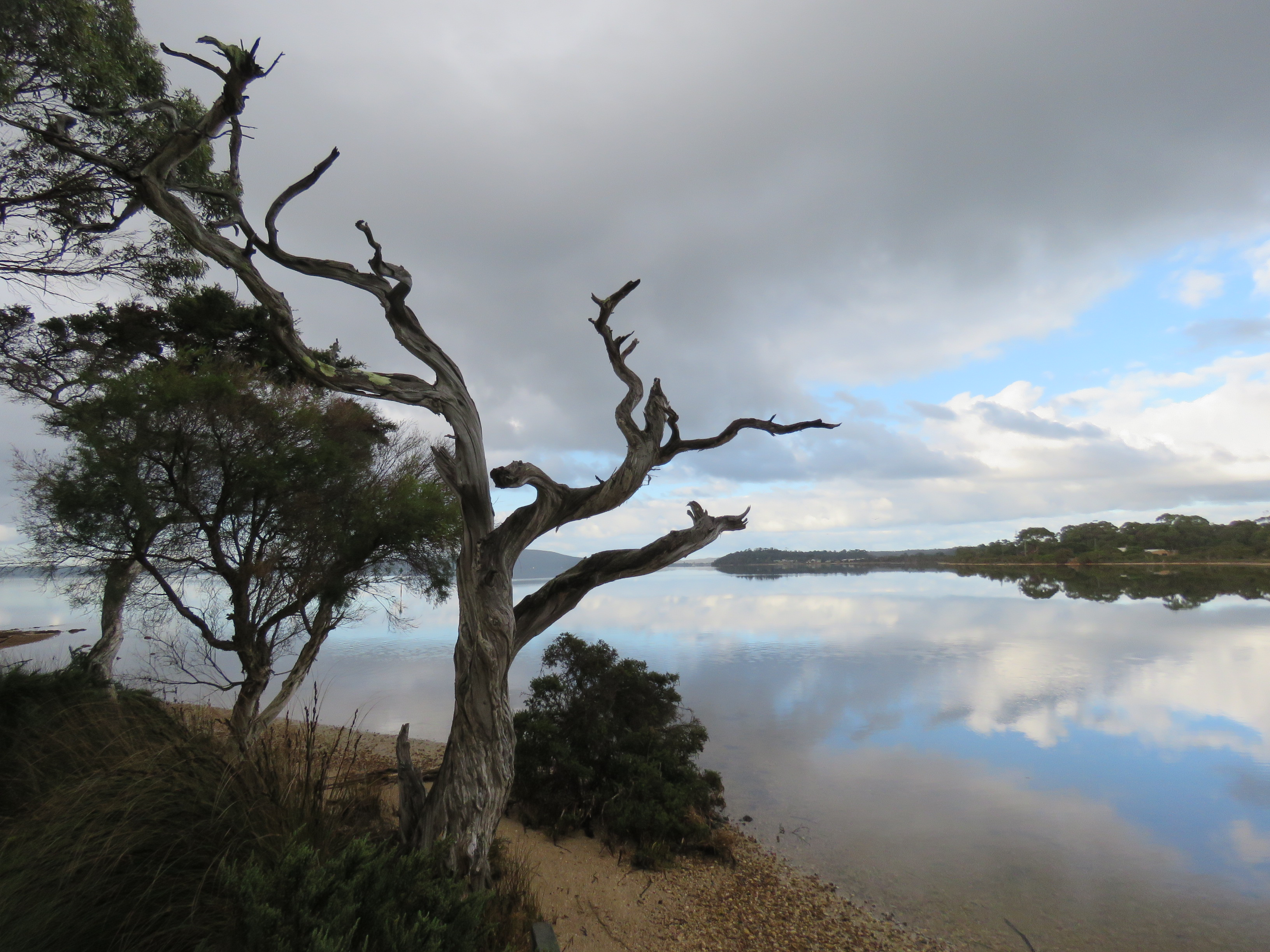
- The harbour in 2022
- Interactive map of Oyster Harbour
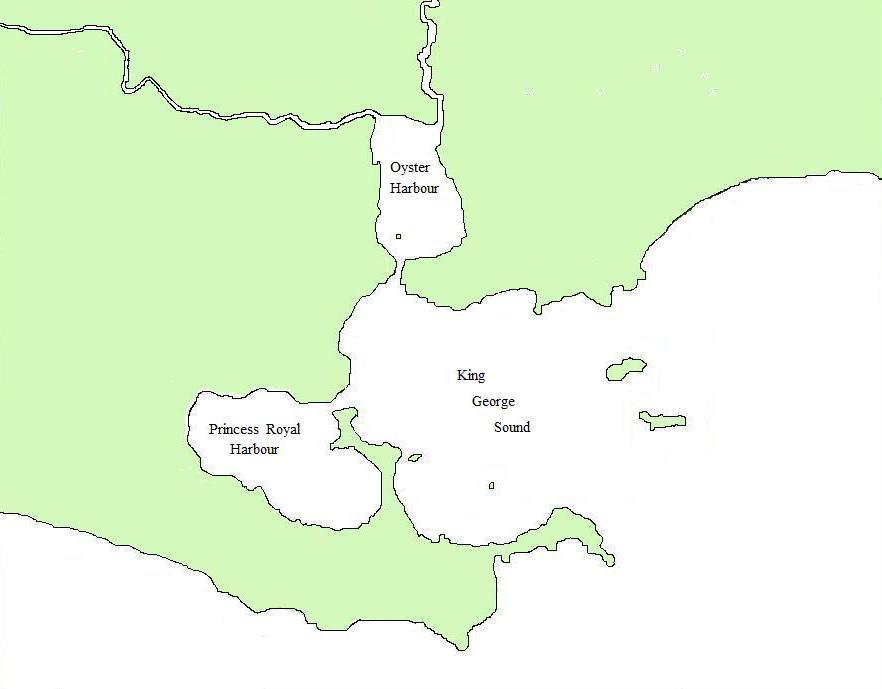
- Location relative to King George Sound
- Location: Albany, Western Australia
- Coordinates: 34°59′38″S 117°56′38″E
- Type: Harbour
- Etymology: Saccostrea glomerata
- Part of: King George Sound
- River sources: Kalgan River; King River
- Ocean/sea sources: Indian Ocean
- Settlements: Bayonet Head; Emu Point; Kalgan; Lower King

Miaritch / Oyster Harbour is a permanently open estuary, north of King George Sound, which covers an area of 15.6 square kilometres (6 sq mi) near Albany, Western Australia.

The harbour is used to shelter a fishing fleet carrying out commercial fishing and the farming of oysters and mussels via a dredged channel around Emu Point to the Emu Point Boat Pens. A significant number of waterbirds use the harbour for feeding. The place is currently a family tourist center. Oyster Harbour is fed by the King and Kalgan Rivers and discharges into King George Sound.

A planned locality of Oyster Harbour on the Lower King Road is under construction with 2,300 home sites.

At the north eastern end near the mouth of the Kalgan River mouth are the Albany Fish Traps, a site of great significance to the local Mineng peoples, constructed over 7,500 years ago.

The harbour was dual named by the City of Albany and Landgate.
