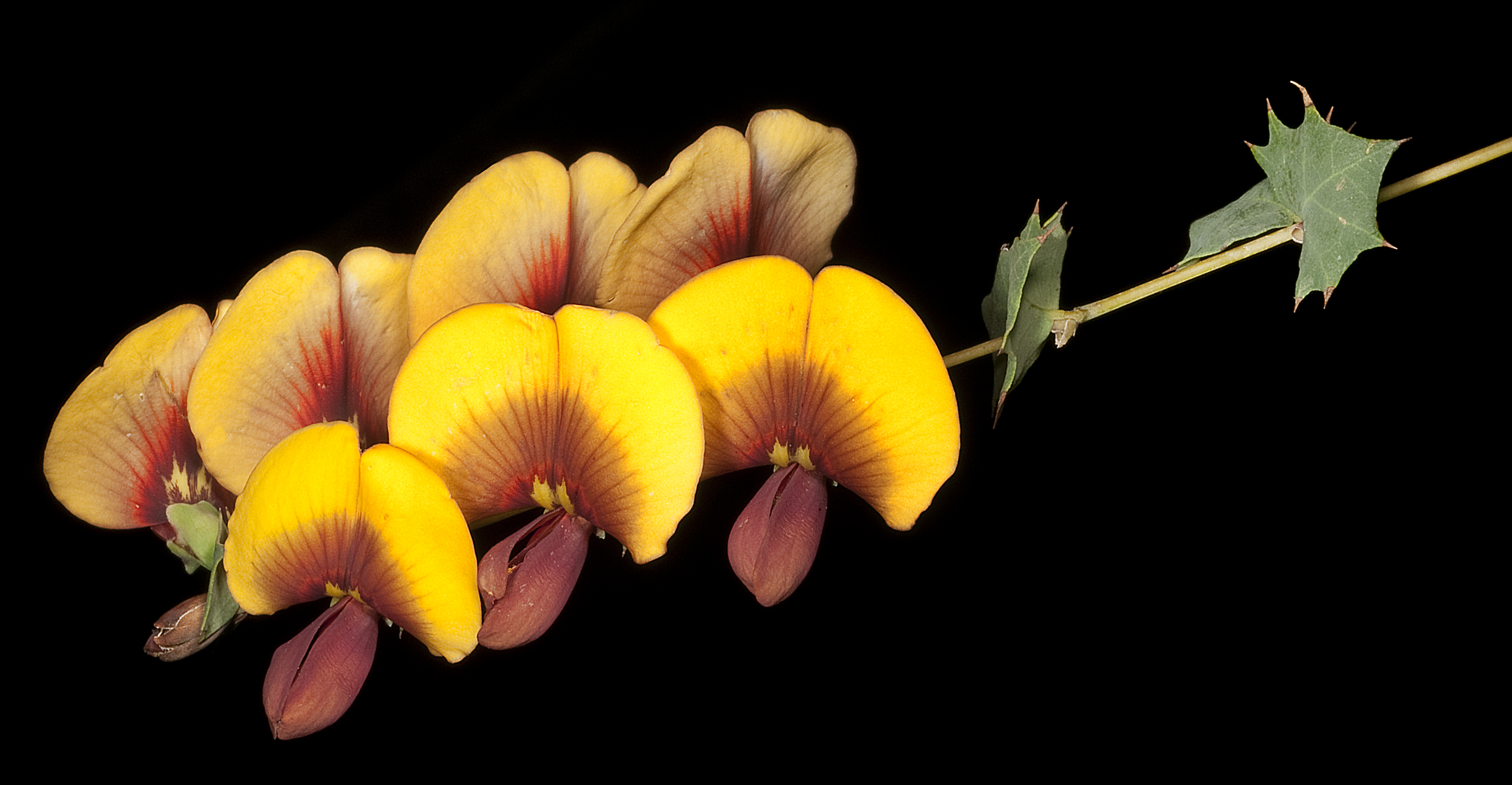

Conservation status
- Least Concern (IUCN 3.1)

Scientific classification
- Kingdom: Plantae
- Clade: Tracheophytes
- Clade: Angiosperms
- Clade: Eudicots
- Clade: Rosids
- Order: Fabales
- Family: Fabaceae
- Subfamily: Faboideae
- Genus: Bossiaea
- Species: B. aquifolium

Binomial name
- Bossiaea aquifolium Benth.
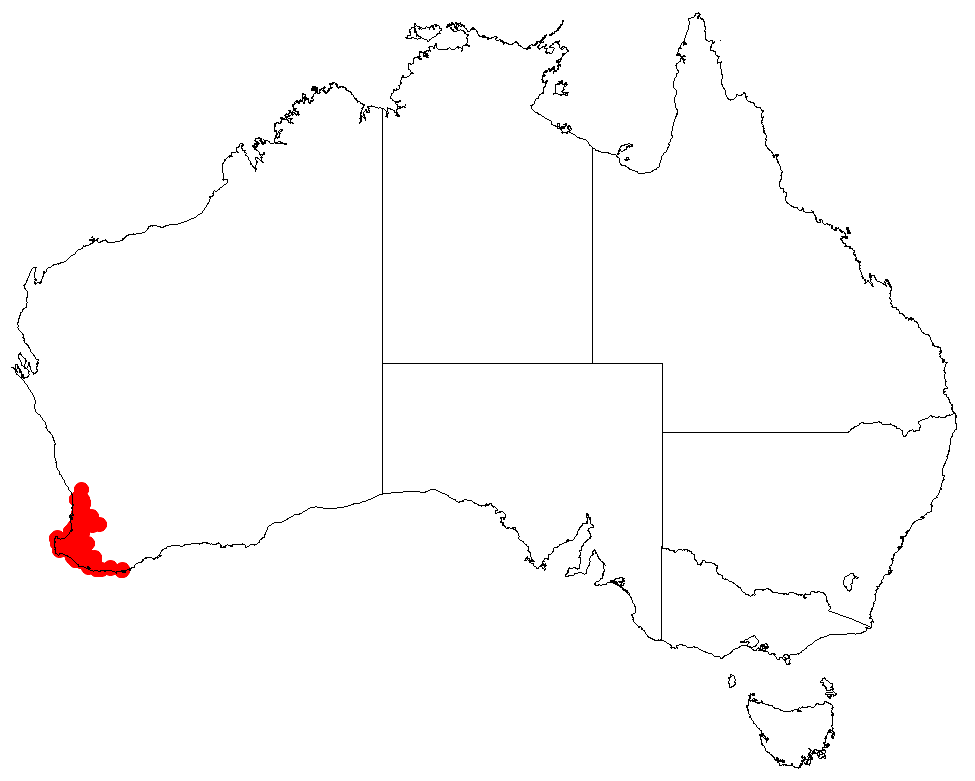
- Occurrence data from AVH

= Bossiaea aquifolium =

Water bush

Species of legume

Bossiaea aquifolium, commonly known as water bush, nedik or netic, is a species of flowering plant in the pea family Fabaceae and is endemic to Southwest Australia. It is a slender shrub or small tree with egg-shaped leaves arranged in opposite pairs and yellowish flowers arranged singly or in pairs on the ends of branchlets.

== Description ==
Bossiaea aquifolium is a slender shrub or tree that typically grows to a height of up to 8 m (26 ft) and has thin, sometimes hairy branchlets. The leaves are arranged in opposite pairs and are holly-like, egg-shaped to more or less round, either with wavy edges and nine or more sharp points on the edges or more than fifteen teeth with only a single sharp point on the tip. The leaves are 8–22 mm (0.31–0.87 in) long and 8–20 mm (0.31–0.79 in) wide on a petiole 0.9–2.2 mm (0.035–0.087 in) long with broadly triangular stipules at the base that are shorter than the petiole. The flowers are borne singly or in pairs in leaf axils near the ends of branchlets with egg-shaped bracts on the peduncle. The five sepals are joined at the base forming a tube 2.3–4.2 mm (0.091–0.165 in) long, the upper two lobes 1–2 mm (0.039–0.079 in) long, the lower three lobes 0.8–1.5 mm (0.031–0.059 in) long. The standard petal is more or less round, 11.8–18 mm (0.46–0.71 in) long, yellow to orange with a reddish-brown base, the wings 9.7–13.7 mm (0.38–0.54 in) wide and reddish, sometimes orange or yellow near the tip, and the keel 10–13 mm (0.39–0.51 in) long and deep red to reddish-brown. Flowering occurs from July to November and the fruit is an oval to egg-shaped pod 11–24 mm (0.43–0.94 in) long. The seeds are reddish to brownish and there are about 70 seeds per gram.

== Taxonomy and naming ==
Bossiaea aquifolium was first described in 1864 by the botanist George Bentham in Flora Australiensis from specimens collected by James Drummond. The specific epithet (aquifolium) is the pre-Linnaean name for holly.

The Noongar peoples know the tree as netic. The common name "water bush" is apt because rainwater collects in leaf axils, and splashes when the plant is brushed against.

In 1994, James H. Ross reduced Bossiaea laidlawiana Tovey & P.Morris to a subspecies of Bossiaea aquifolium as Bossiaea aquifolium subsp. laidlawiana in the journal Muelleria and the name, and that of the autonym, are accepted by the Australian Plant Census:

- Bossiaea aquifolium Benth. subsp. aquifolium has leaves with between five and eleven sharp point on the edges, the edges wavy between the points;
- Bossiaea aquifolium subsp. laidlawiana (Tovey & P.Morris) J.H.Ross has leaves with only the tip having a sharp point, but there are eleven to twenty-five teeth on the edges, and there is no wavy edge between the teeth.

== Distribution and habitat ==
Water bush grows in clay or loam soils over laterite or granite. It is a common understorey shrub in forested areas where jarrah and marri trees are found in the Jarrah Forest, Swan Coastal Plain and Warren biogeographic regions. Subspecies aquifolium occurs from near Mundaring to near Margaret River and inland to Collie and Nannup, and subsp. laidlawiana from near Nannup and south to near Lake Muir.

== Conservation status ==
Both subspecies of B. aquifolium are listed as "not threatened" by the Government of Western Australia Department of Parks and Wildlife.

== Use in horticulture ==
This species can be grown from seed and prefers a light to medium well-drained moist soil in a semi-protected position. It is drought resistant but susceptible to frost. Hot water treatment or scarification is recommended prior to planting.
