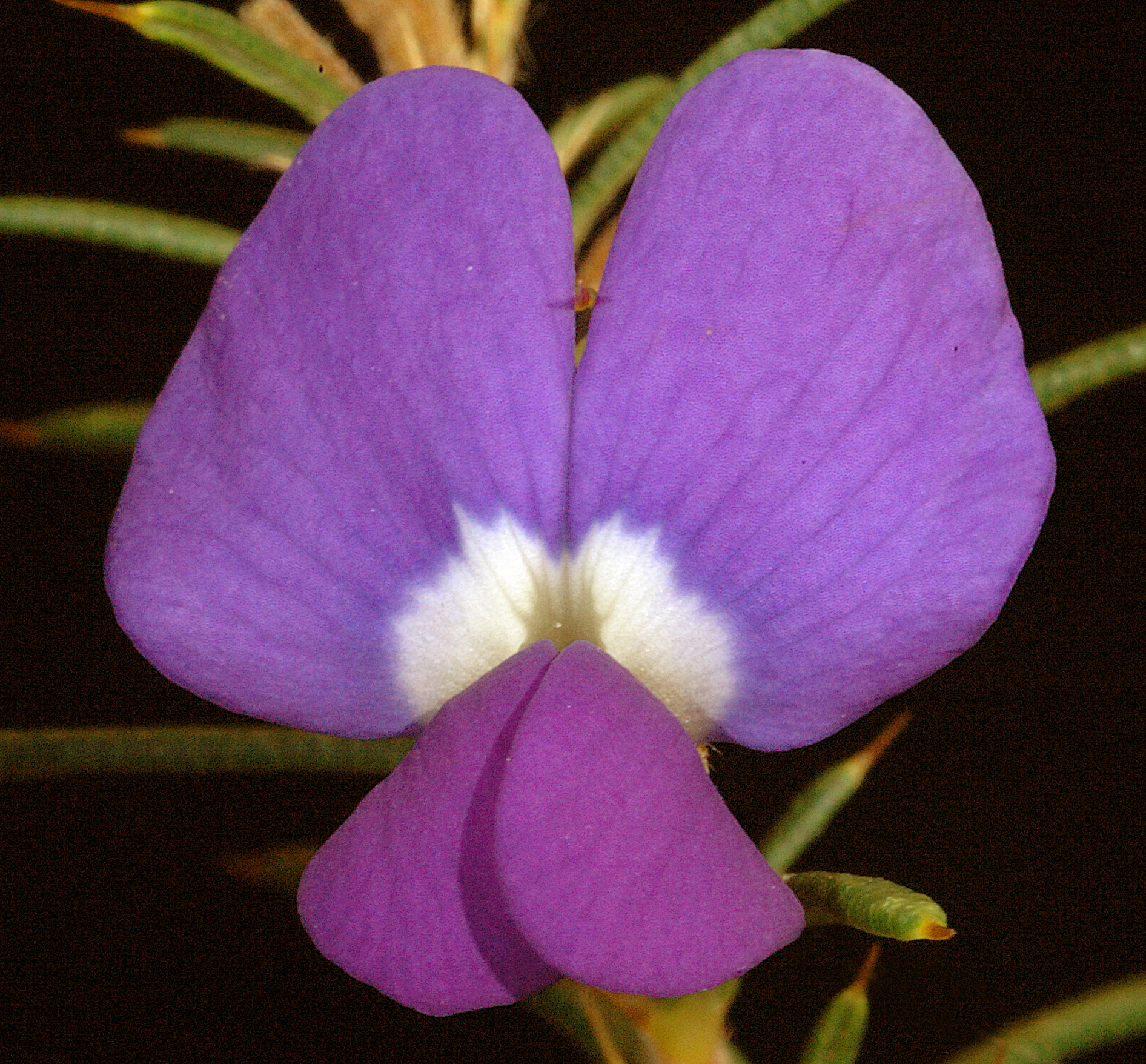

Scientific classification
- Kingdom: Plantae
- Clade: Tracheophytes
- Clade: Angiosperms
- Clade: Eudicots
- Clade: Rosids
- Order: Fabales
- Family: Fabaceae
- Subfamily: Faboideae
- Genus: Hovea
- Species: H. pungens

Binomial name
- Hovea pungens Benth.

Synonyms
- Hovea pungens var. major Paxton; Hovea pungens var. major Dombrain nom. illeg.; Hovea pungens Benth. var. pungens; Hovea pungens var. ulicina (Meisn.) Benth.; Hovea ulicina Meisn.

= Hovea pungens =

Devil's pins

Species of legume

Hovea pungens, commonly known as devil's pins, is a species of flowering plant in the family Fabaceae and is endemic to Western Australia. It is a small, upright shrub with dark green leaves and purple flowers.

== Description ==
Hovea pungens is an upright shrub that typically grows to a height of 0.2 to 1.8 metres (1 to 6 ft), and single stemmed or multi-branched. The branchlets thickly covered with a combination of straight, creased, flattened to spreading or upright hairs. The dark green leaves are linear, elliptic-oblong to egg or lance-shaped, 1–2.5 cm (0.39–0.98 in) long and up to 3 mm (0.12 in) wide, upper surface smooth, lower surface hairy, margins rolled under, petiole 0.5 mm (0.020 in) long, and the leaves ending in a sharp point. The inflorescence are in leaf axils either sessile or on a peduncle up to 1 mm (0.039 in) long. The purple pea-shaped flowers are borne singly or in a small grouping of two or three on a pedicel 0.3–0.9 cm (0.12–0.35 in) long that are thickly covered in hairs. The standard petal is 12–16.8 mm (0.47–0.66 in) long and 12–16 mm (0.47–0.63 in) wide with a white centre flare,wings are 9.8–12.5 mm (0.39–0.49 in) long and 3.5–6.2 mm (0.14–0.24 in) wide, and the keel 4.2–6.7 mm (0.17–0.26 in) long and 2.2–7 mm (0.087–0.276 in) wide. Flowering occurs from May to November and the fruit is a smooth, oval or ellipsoid pod, 0.6–0.9 mm (0.024–0.035 in) long and 0.7–0.9 mm (0.028–0.035 in) wide. The Noongar name for the plant is buyenak.

== Taxonomy and naming ==
Hovea pungens was first formally described in 1837 by George Bentham and the description was published in Enumeratio plantarum quas in Novae Hollandiae ora austro-occidentali ad fluvium Cygnorum et in sinu Regis Georgii collegit Carolus Liber Baro de Hügel. The specific epithet (pungens) means "ending in a sharp, hard point" referring to the leaf.

== Distribution and habitat ==
Devil's pins grows in shallow soils among granite, sandy and clay loams, outcrops, coastal limestone on flats, woodland, low heath and undulating sandplains. The species has a distribution on the south west coast in the Wheatbelt, Peel, South West, Great Southern and Goldfields-Esperance regions of Western Australia.
