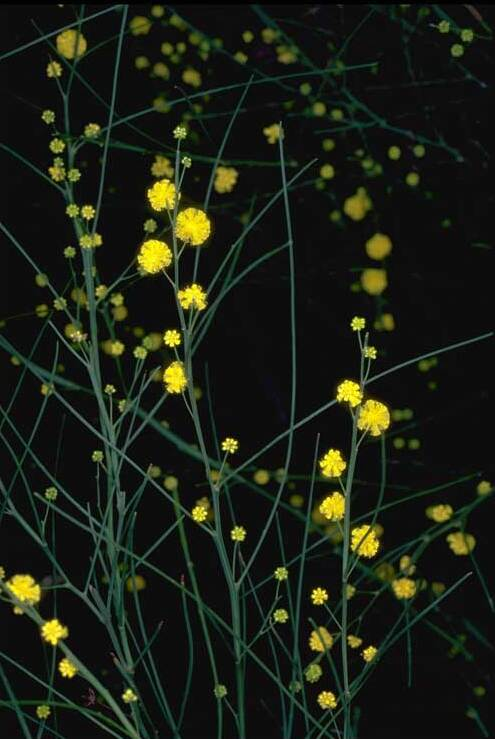

Scientific classification
- Kingdom: Plantae
- Clade: Tracheophytes
- Clade: Angiosperms
- Clade: Eudicots
- Clade: Rosids
- Order: Fabales
- Family: Fabaceae
- Subfamily: Caesalpinioideae
- Clade: Mimosoid clade
- Genus: Acacia
- Species: A. extensa

Binomial name
- Acacia extensa Lindl.
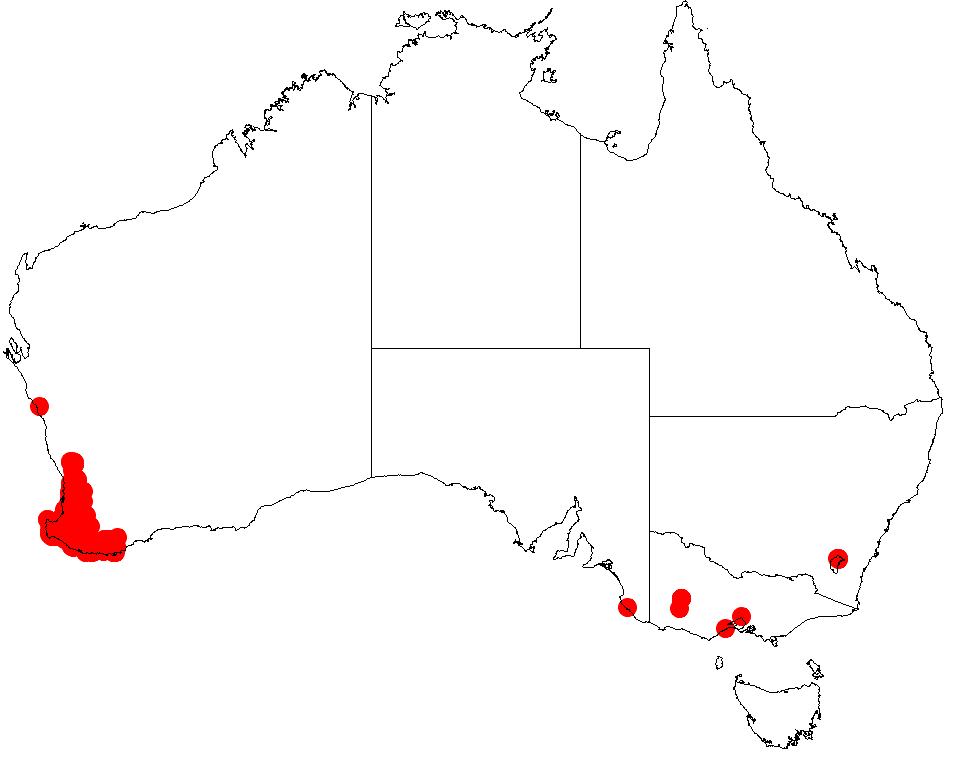
- Occurrence data from AVH

Synonyms
- Acacia calamistrata Jacques; Acacia graminea Lehm. nom. inval., nom. nud.; Acacia graminea Lehm. ex Meisn.; Acacia pentaedra Regel; Racosperma extensum (Lindl.) Pedley

= Acacia extensa =

Species of legume

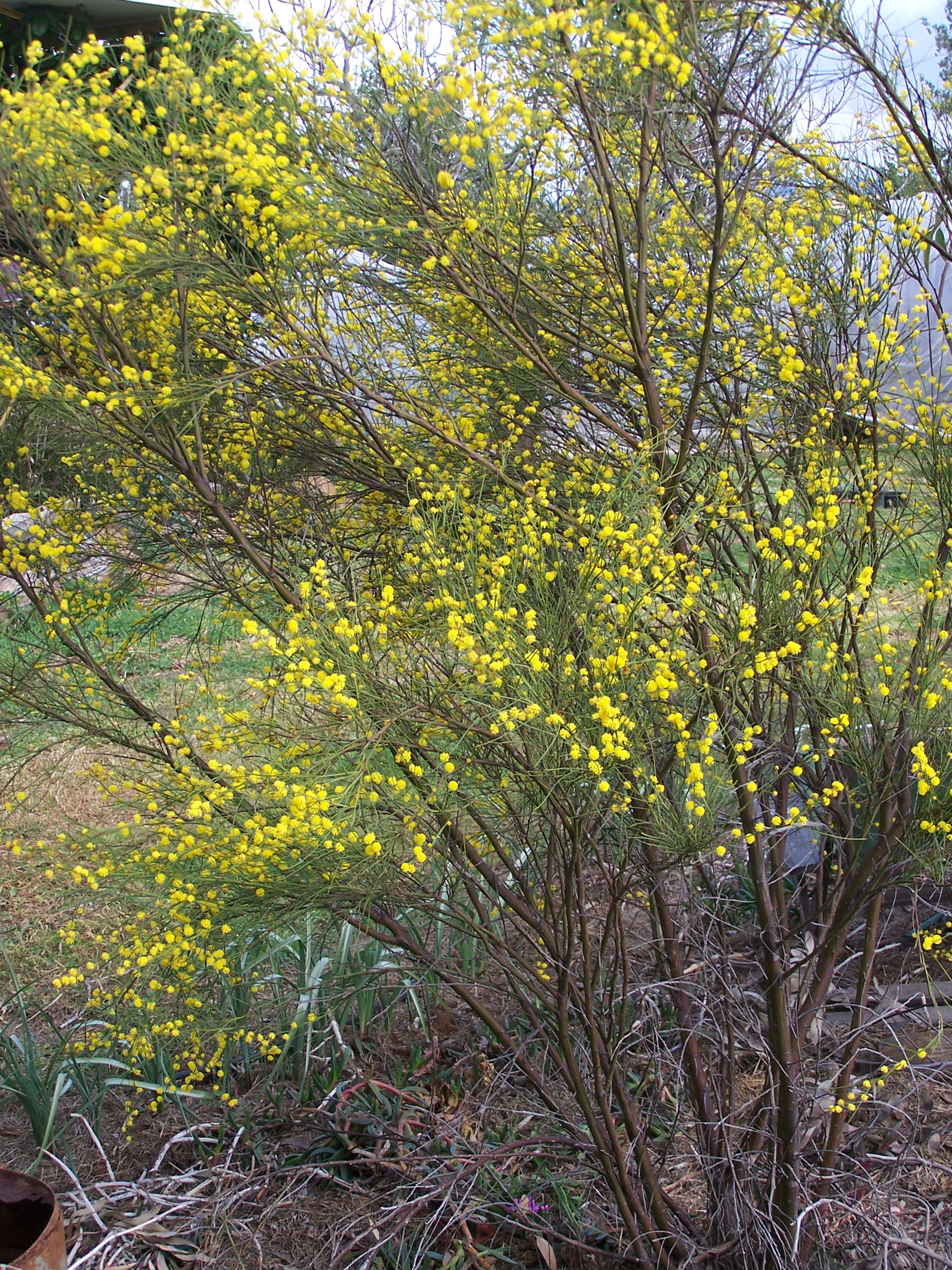
Habit

Acacia extensa, commonly known as wiry wattle, is a species of flowering plant in the family Fabaceae and is endemic to the south-west of Western Australia. It is a spindly, open shrub with angled, sometimes narrowly winged branchlets, few, often thread-like phyllodes resembling the branchlets, spherical heads of light golden yellow flowers and linear pods somewhat resembling a string of beads.

== Description ==
Acacia extensa is a spindly, open shrub that typically grows to a height of up to 3 m (9.8 ft) and has angled branchlets that are often flattened at the tips and sometimes narrowly winged. The phyllodes are often few in number, often thread-like and resemble the branchlets, 60–240 mm (2.4–9.4 in) long and 0.8–1.8 mm (0.031–0.071 in) wide with five prominent yellowish veins. The flowers are borne in spherical heads in racemes resembling the branchlets on peduncles 3–8 mm (0.12–0.31 in) long, each head with 12 to 24 light golden yellow flowers. Flowering occurs from August to October, and the pods are linear, straight to slightly curved, up to 90 mm (3.5 in) long, 3–4 mm (0.12–0.16 in) wide, firmly papery to thinly leathery, and somewhat resemble a string of beads. The seeds are oblong, 4–5 mm (0.16–0.20 in) long and shiny dark brown with an aril on the end.

== Taxonomy ==
Acacia extensa was first formally described in 1839 by John Lindley in his book A Sketch of the Vegetation of the Swan River Colony, from specimens collected by James Drummond in the Swan River Colony. The specific epithet (extensa) means 'stretched out, extended or spreading out', and refers to the open habit of the species.

== Distribution ==
Wiry wattle grows in sand and laterite in the understorey of forest along watercourses or near lakes and swamps and is widely distributed from near Mogumber and south to Albany in the Esperance Plains, Jarrah Forest, Swan Coastal Plain and Warren bioregions of south-western Western Australia.

== See also ==
- List of Acacia species
