= Kalgan River =

River in Western Australia

Coordinates: 34°57′03″S 117°58′41″E

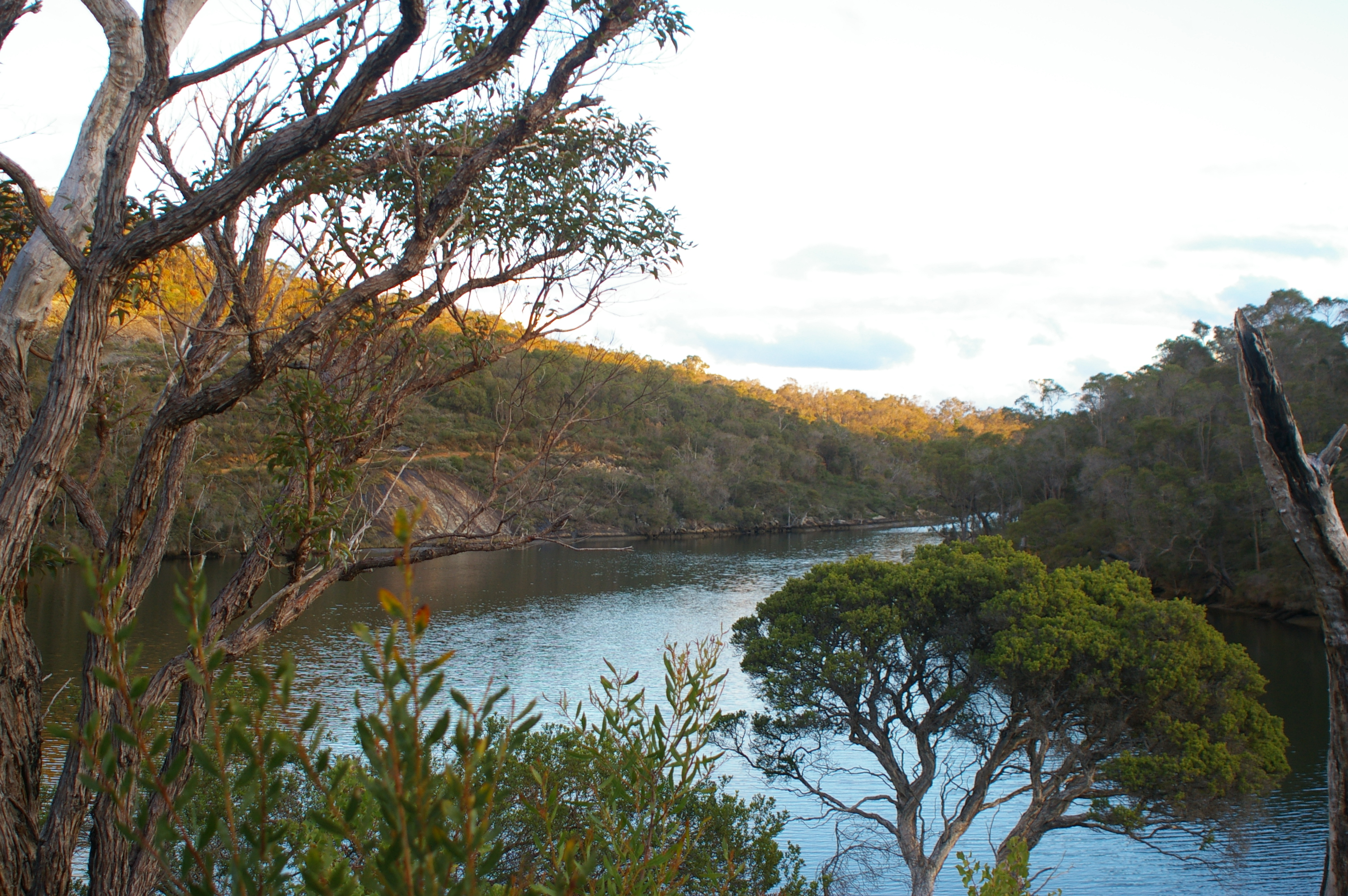
- Southern end of Kalgan River near Lower Kalgan Bridge

Location
- Country: Australia

Physical characteristics
- Source
  - location: Stirling Ranges
  - elevation: 199 metres (653 ft)
- Mouth
  - location: Oyster Harbour, Albany, Western Australia
- Length: 140 kilometres (87 mi)
- Basin size: 2,562 km^{2} (989 sq mi)
- Discharge
  - average: 1.69 m^{3}/s (53,000 ML/a; 60 cu ft/s)

The Kalgan River is a river in the Great Southern region of Western Australia.

== Geography ==
The river is 140 kilometres (87 mi) long and, along with the King River, drains into Oyster Harbour. The lower 9 km of the river take the form of a drowned river valley with steep hillsides of forest and farmland, and the occasional outcrop of granite. The river's source is west of the Stirling Ranges. It rises north-west of Kendenup and flows generally southwards until it reaches Oyster Harbour about 10 km north-east of Albany. The Kalgan River is the region’s fourth largest river in terms of average annual flow (53,400 megalitres), and has the third largest catchment area (2,562 km^{2}).

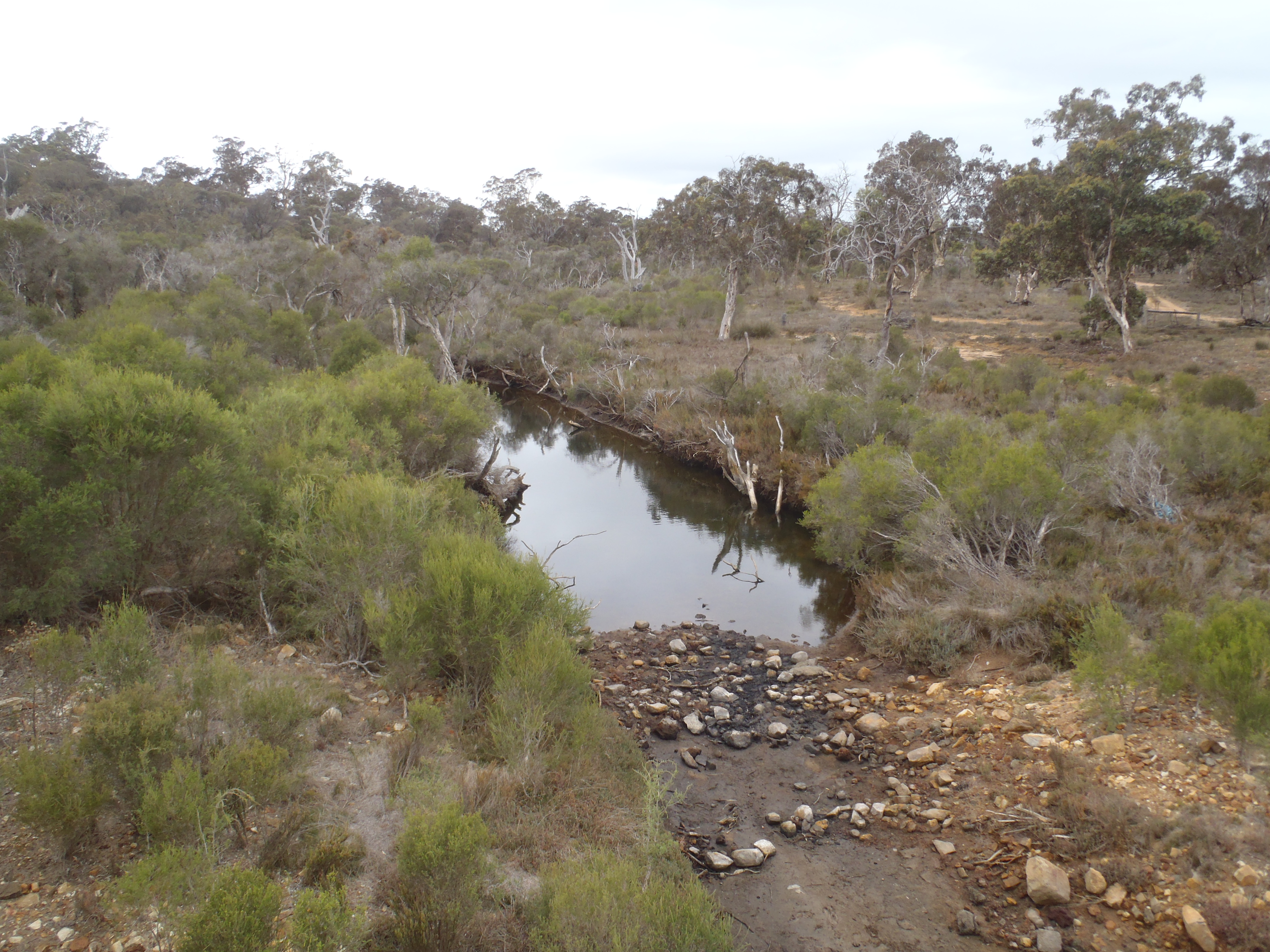
The River near Kamballup between the Porongurups and the Stirling Range

The upper reaches of the Kalgan River lie within the National Park. These tributaries are marginally saline to brackish, suggesting the levels of salinity are natural. The loss of catchment vegetation (66% of the catchment is cleared) has increased salinity levels downstream. The lower section of the Kalgan River is tidal; a rockbar at the Upper Kalgan bridge separates the upper section from the tidal lower section. The tributaries of the Kalgan River include Napier Creek, Boonawarrup Creek, Young River, Stony Creek and Gaalgegup Creek. The river flows through two pools of note: Meriwarbelup Pool and Noorubup Pool.

== History ==
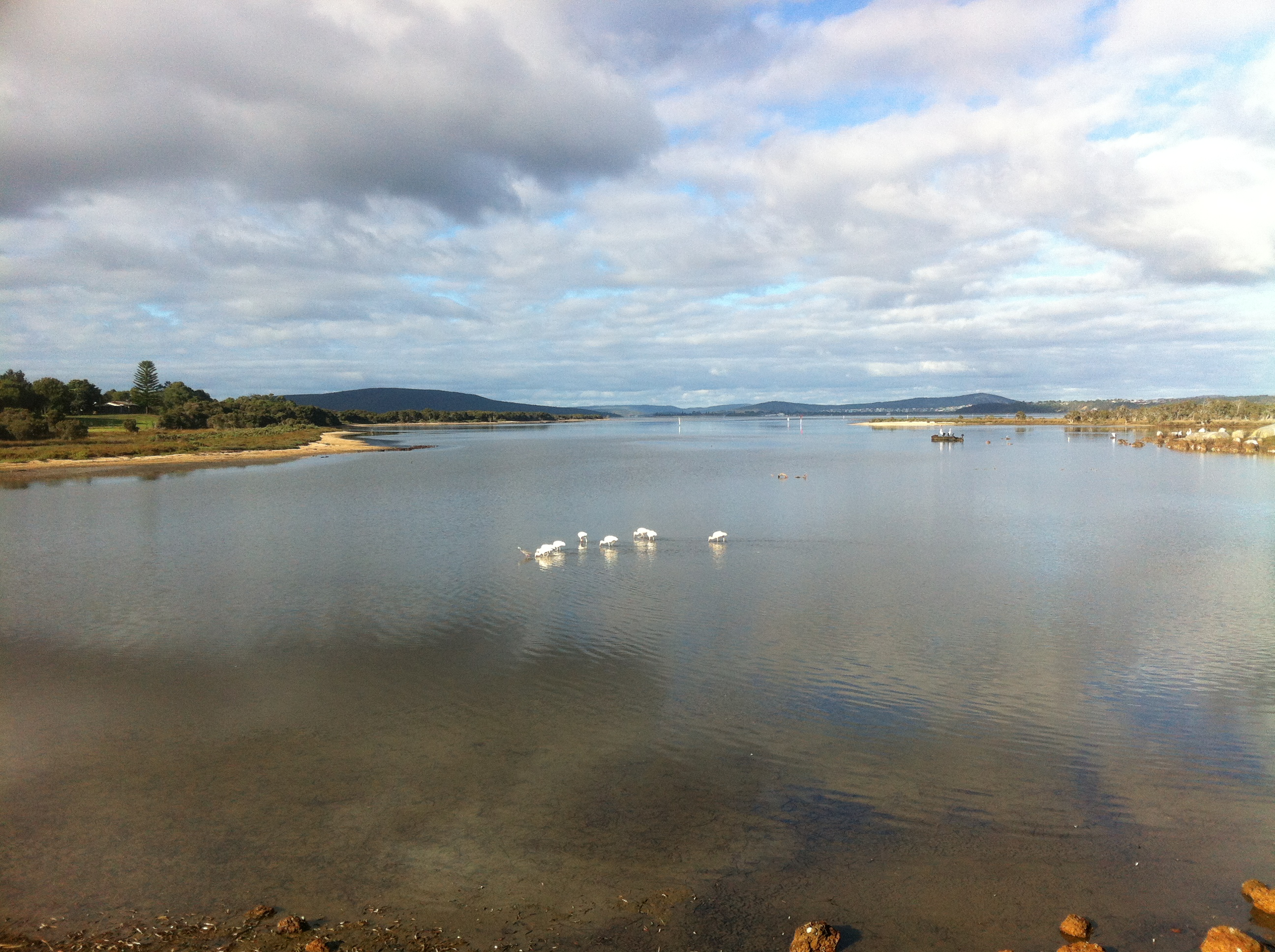
Mouth of Kalgan River into Oyster Harbour

The Kalgan River was named the "Riviere des Francais" by the French Scientific Expedition in 1803, captained by French explorer Nicolas Baudin, in the ship Géographe, which anchored in what is now known as Frenchmans Bay, and was subsequently known as the "French River" by early settlers. The explorer Alexander Collie recorded the river as "Kal-gan-up" in April 1831. The name Kalganup is believed to be the Noongar word for "place of many waters". Kalganup is also thought to mean "place of fishes" and there are still the remains of Aboriginal fish traps. The traps, known as the Albany Fish Traps have been situated here for at least the last 7,500 years.

== Flora ==
The fringing vegetation of the estuarine portion of the Kalgan River is dominated by the saltwater paperbark trees surrounded by dense stands of coastal saw sedge and shore rushes. The downstream freshwater parts of the river have a much greater variety of species, with a fringing forest that includes swamp paperbark, marri, jarrah, wattle and Western Australian peppermint trees. Further inland, species such as swamp yate, flooded gum and varieties of Banksia and Hakea are found. Parts of the riverbank that have been cleared support a variety of introduced weeds that are shallow rooted. In areas in which the native deep-rooted species have been lost, erosion of the river bank has become a problem. Many wild flowers can be found along the Luke Pen Walk, a trail that follows the river for 9 km before it reaches Oyster Harbour. Some of the varieties include Hovea trisperma (common hovea), Hovea pungens (devil’s pins), Hovea elliptica (tree hovea), Adenanthos obovatus (basket flower), Lysinema ciliatum (curry flower), Leucopogeon pulchelus (beard heath), Banksia sessilis (parrot bush), Banksia squarrosa (pringle) and Acacia extensa (wiry wattle).

== Fauna ==
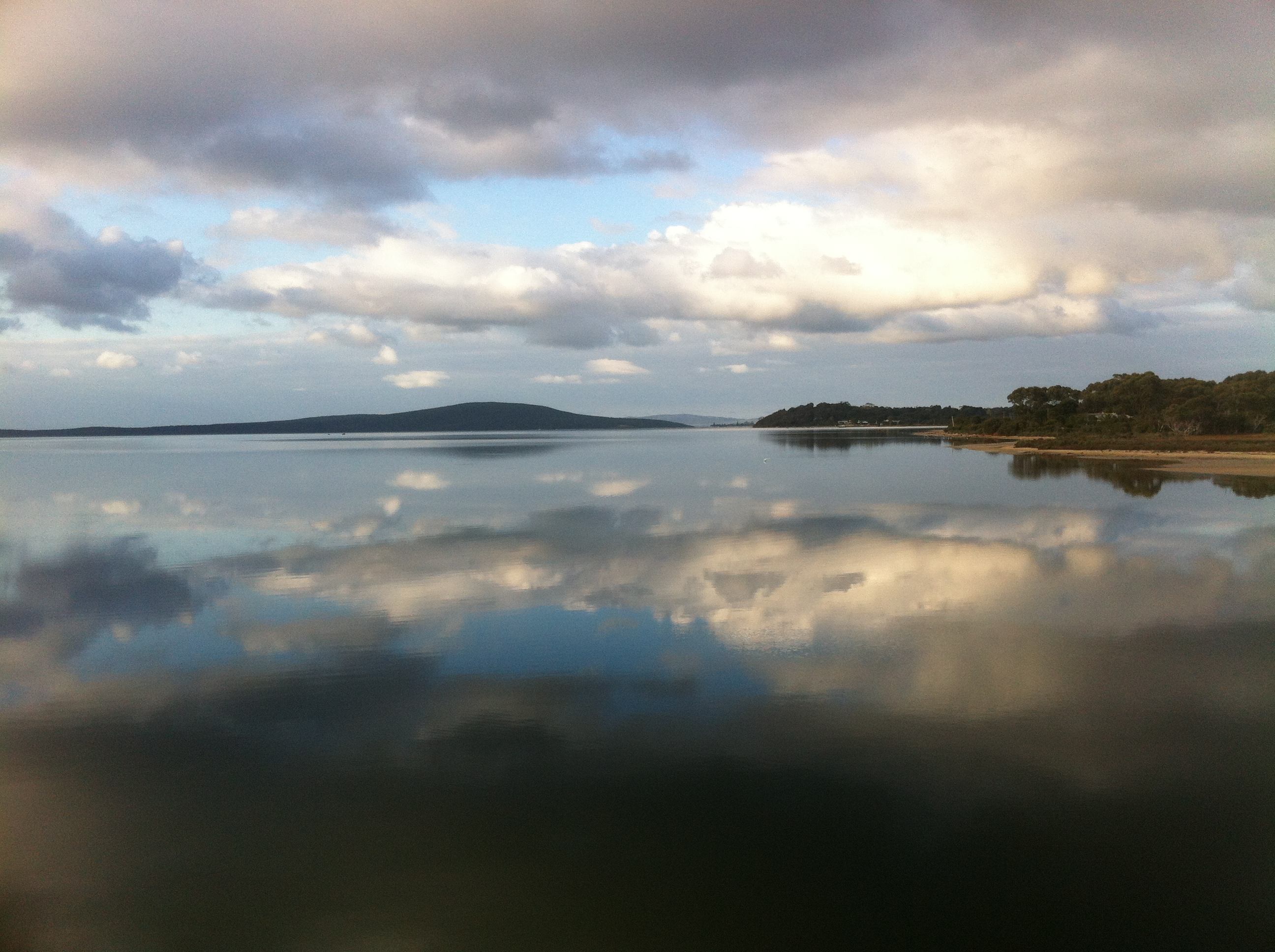
Oyster harbour from lower Kalgan bridge

The estuarine end of the Kalgan River is good fishing for many species including black bream, with a few skippy, herring, mulloway and whiting. The Kalgan River is renowned as being an excellent place to fish for bream and some of the state's largest bream have been caught in the river. Smaller freshwater species that can be found in the Kalgan River include the western galaxias (Galaxias occidentalis), the common jollytail (Galaxias maculatus), the mud minnow (Galaxiella munda), Balston's pygmy perch (Nannatherina balston), nightfish (Bostockia porosa) and the western pygmy perch (Edelia vittata). The river is home to a large population of birds. In the estuarine part of the river, species such as the Australian pelican, little black cormorant, pied cormorant, pied oystercatcher, black-winged stilt, common sandpiper, Australian white ibis, straw-necked ibis, yellow-billed spoonbill, Pacific gull and Caspian tern can often be seen. The freshwater parts of the river also support an enormous variety of birds including nankeen kestrel, Australian hobby, wedge-tailed eagle, short-billed black cockatoo, long-billed black cockatoo, galah, little corella, purple-crowned lorikeet, red-capped parrot, laughing kookaburra, willie wagtail, white-breasted robin, splendid fairywren, New Holland honeyeater, red wattlebird and red-eared firetail. Amphibious species that can be commonly be found in and around the river are frogs, such as the western banjo and moaning frogs. Reptiles frequently found in the area include tiger snakes and dugites.

== Bridges ==
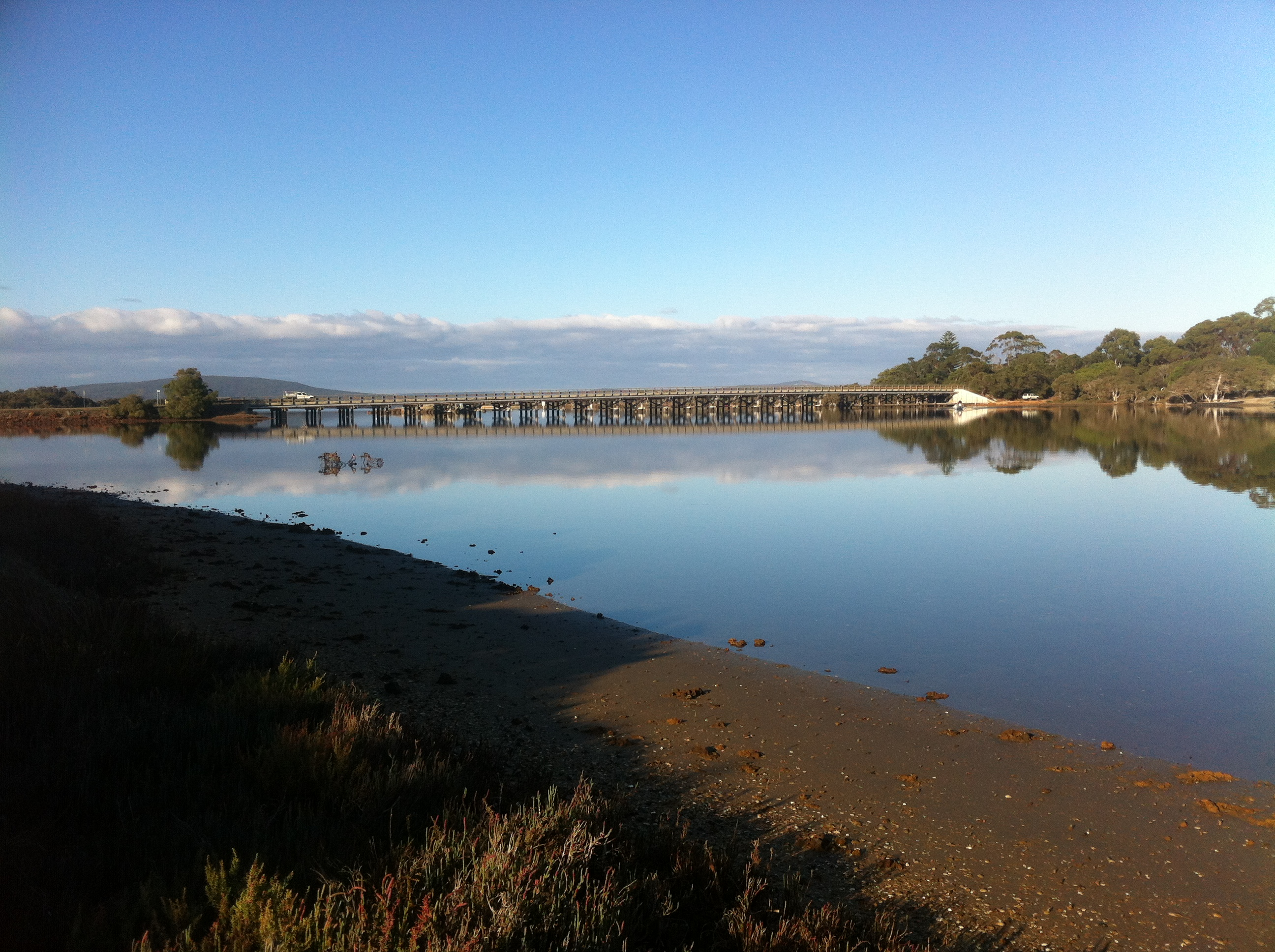
Lower Kalgan bridge from east bank

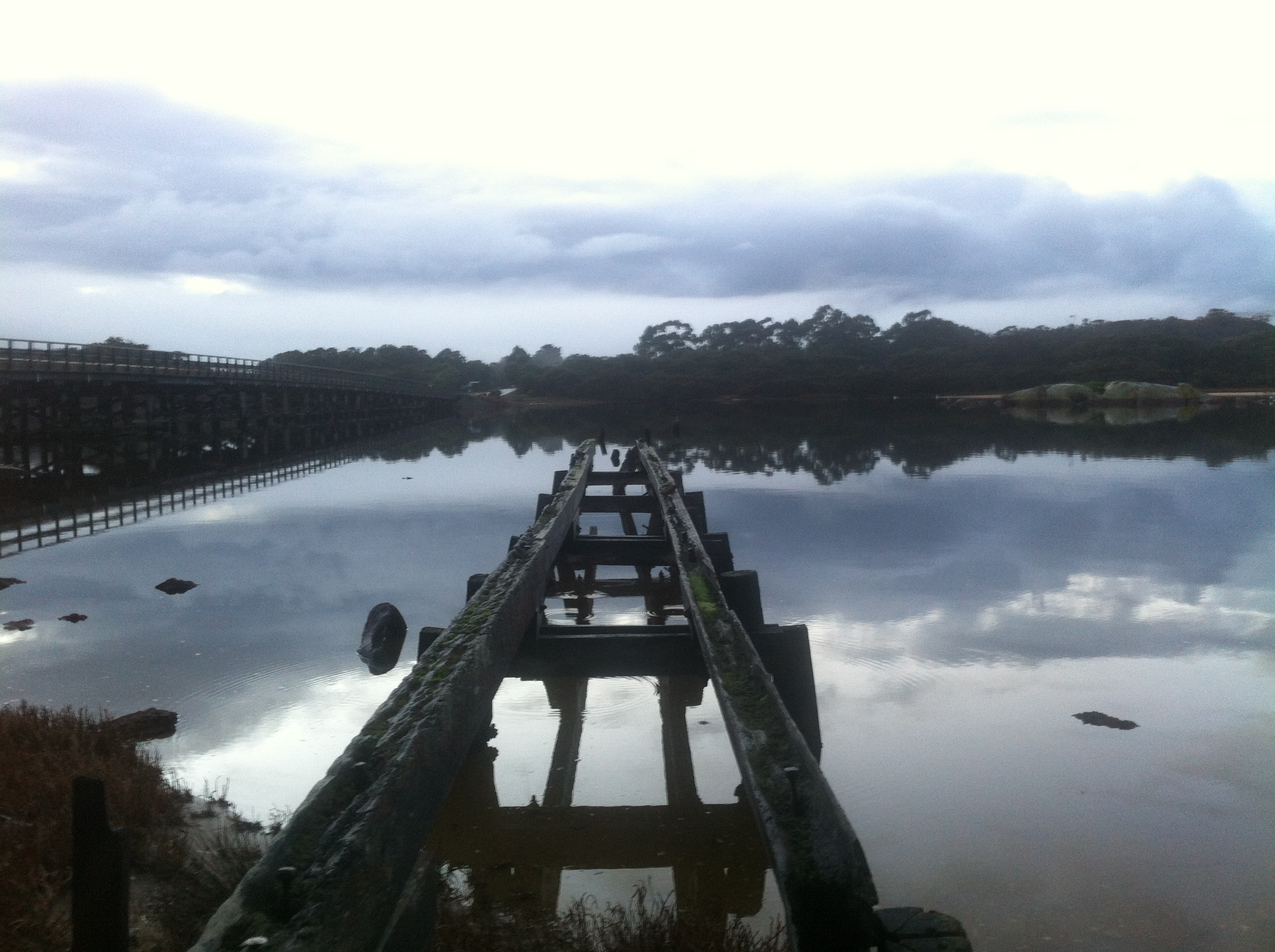
Government Jetty with Lower Kalgan Bridge to the left

The southern end of the Kalgan River has two bridges of note: the Upper Kalgan bridge and the Lower Kalgan Bridge. The Lower Kalgan Bridge was built from 1906 and opened in 1908. At 900 feet (274 m) in length, it was the longest of its kind over water in the state at the time. At this time, the bridge had a special navigation span, 40 feet (12 m) wide at the deepest part of the river. The original bridge remained in place until 1958, when it was replaced, but the navigation span trusses were removed for preservation and are now on display in the park at the western end of the bridge.

The Government Jetty was also built in 1906 so that timber and other construction materials could be delivered adjacent to the Lower King Bridge site. The jetty was also later used as a landing point for tourist vessels that travelled upriver from Albany. It is now in a state of disrepair.

== Islands ==
The Kalgan River contains many small islands, particularly in the section below the Upper Kalgan bridge. The largest is Honeymoon Island (also called Elbow Island), which is slightly upstream of the Lower Kalgan bridge. This island has a small clearing and can be readily landed upon. A smaller island, Willie Island, is a little downstream of the Upper Kalgan bridge.

== Dreamtime ==
The Kalgan River is a place of great significance to the local Noongar people. A Dreaming story tells of a husband and wife who lived in the Porongurup Range. The husband beat his wife terribly but she escaped from him by stumbling through the thick bushland. As the wife ran through the bush, her digging stick trailed over the Earth and cut open the soil behind her forming the path of the Kalgan river.

== Luke Pen Walk ==
The Luke Pen Walk is a track that follows the Kalgan River; it was constructed in 1997. The walk is described as easy with the terrain being generally flat and even. With a total length of 9 kilometres (6 mi) it can take about 4 hours to complete the round trip. The walk was named after Dr Luke Pen, a local scientist, who made significant contributions to the local community with his preservation work. The walk was named in 2002 following Pen's death. The northern end of the walk is near the Upper Kalgan Bridge and is on the eastern bank of the river, the southern end of the walk is located at the end of East Bank road about 3 kilometres (2 mi) north of the lower Kalgan bridge.

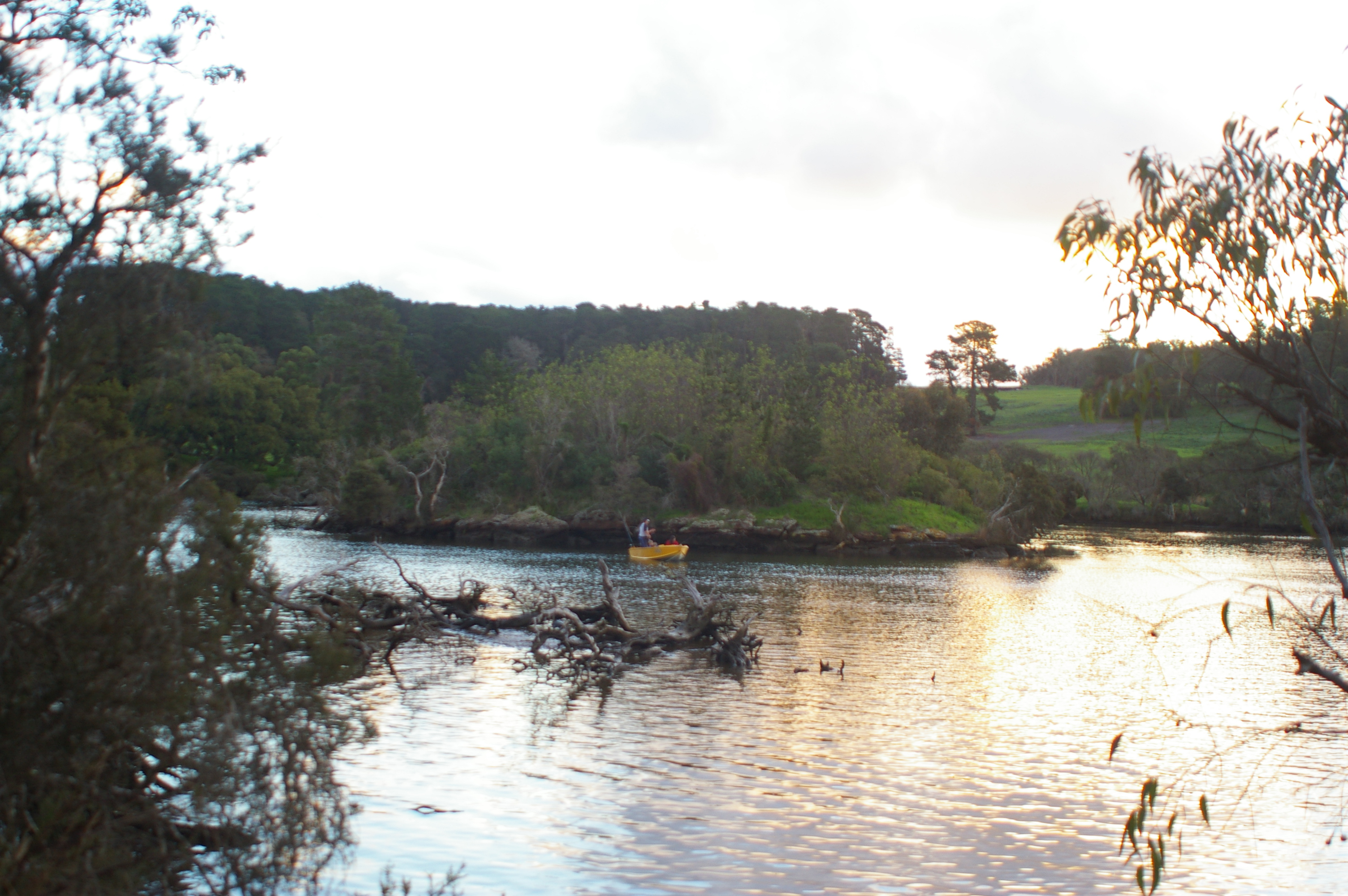
Kalgan River - Honeymoon Island

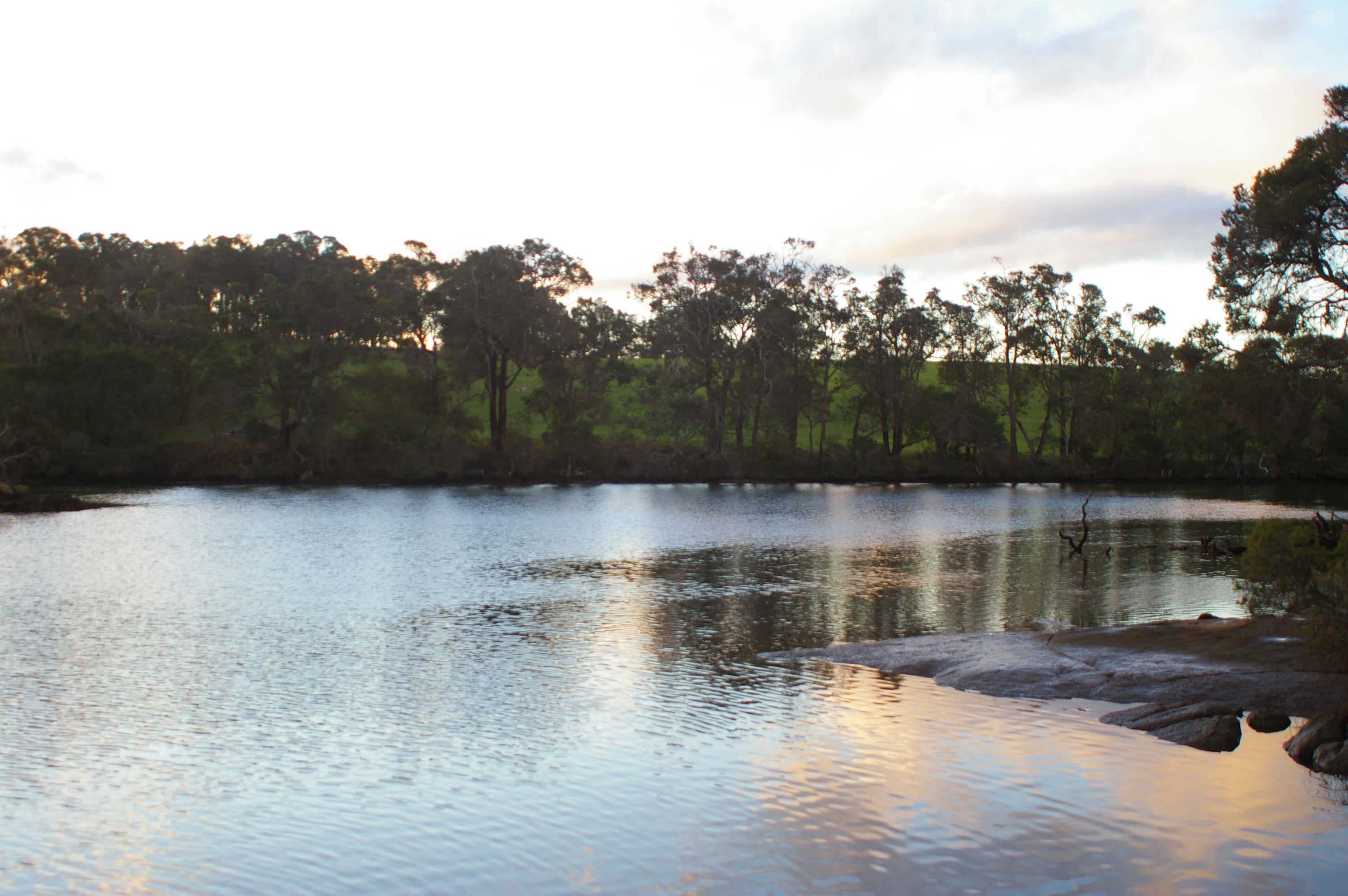
Kalgan River southern end

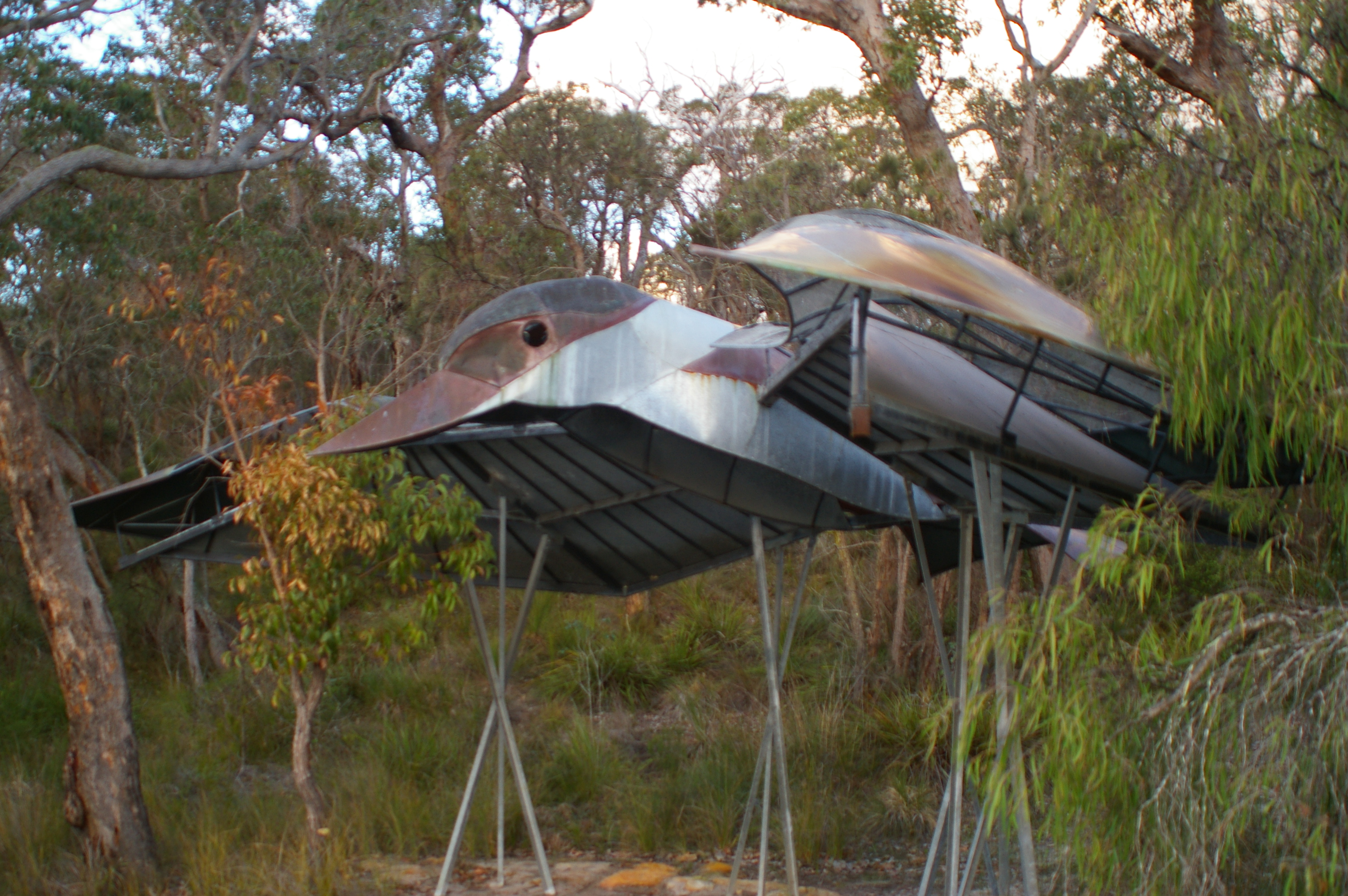
Kingfisher sculpture near end of Luke Pen Walk
