= Ellen Cove Jetty =

Heritage listed jetty in Albany Western Australia

Coordinates: 35.02574°S 117.9172°E

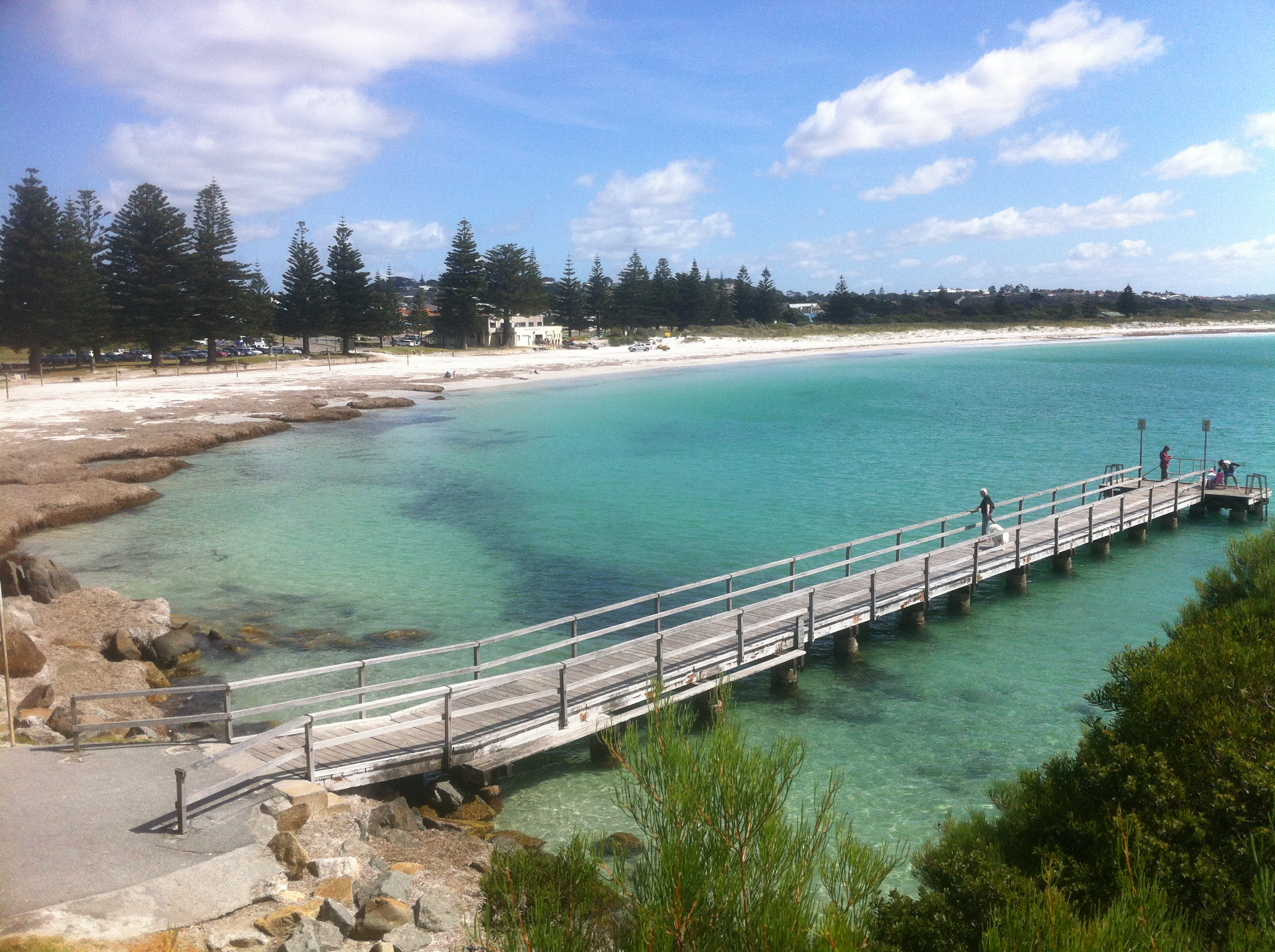
Ellen Cove Jetty

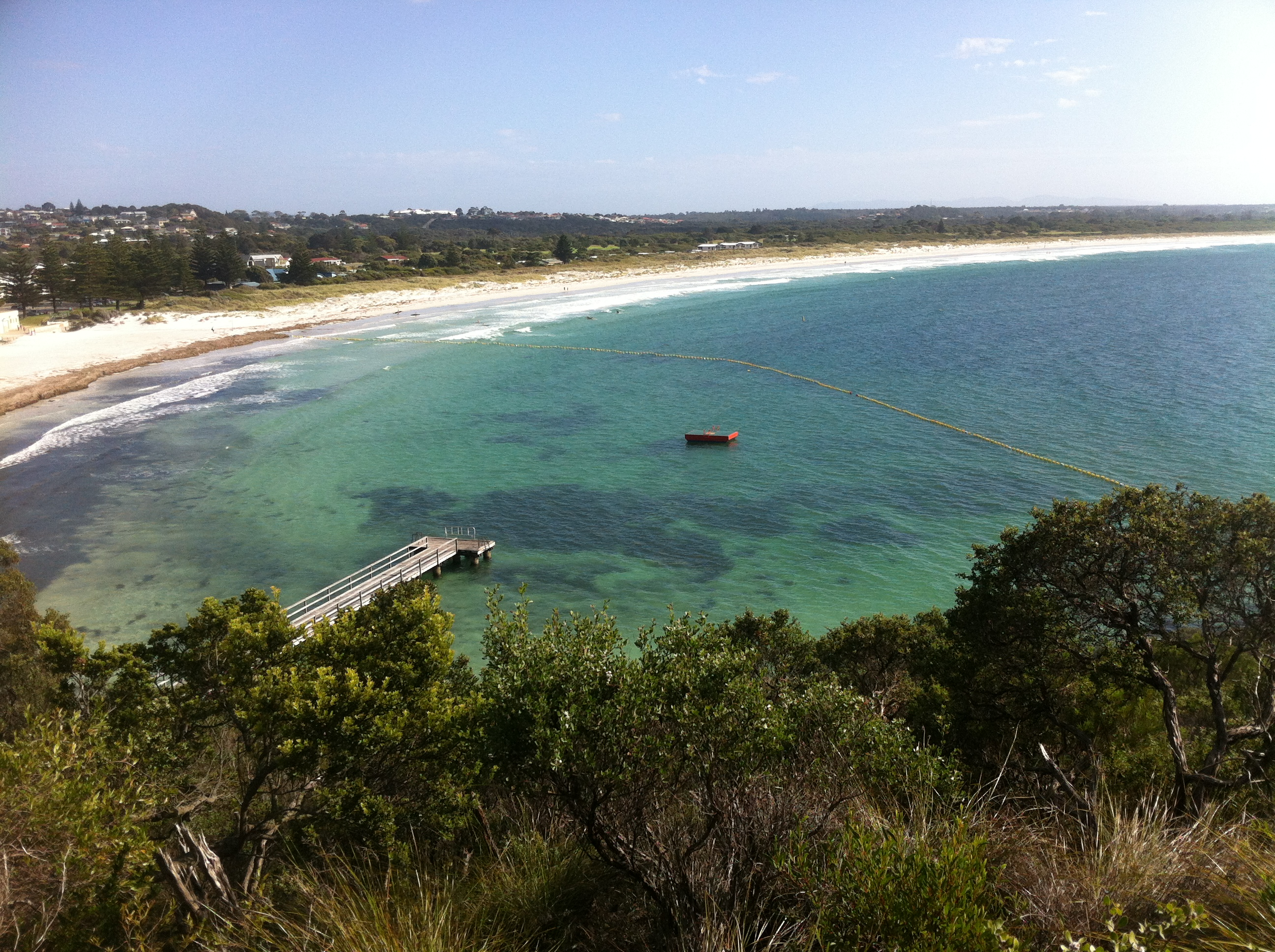
Yellow floats of Middleton Beach shark barrier enclosing the jetty

Ellen Cove Jetty also known as Middleton Beach Jetty is a jetty found at the southern end of Middleton Beach in King George Sound in Albany in the Great Southern region of Western Australia.

Work commenced on the jetty with piles being driven into the sand bed at Ellen Cove in late 1899; construction was completed in 1901, at a cost of £150.

The jetty served in the transport of goods and people of Albany. It is now primarily used for recreational purposes.

It is constructed from reinforced concrete and wood, 15 concrete piles set at regular intervals with wooden decking spanning the piles. The jetty has been rebuilt several times with no evidence that any of the original structure remains.

Both the jetty and the mature Norfolk Island pine trees along the shoreline were listed with the Heritage Council of Western Australia in 2000.

The Middleton Beach shark barrier was built in 2016 enclosing the waters around the jetty.

== See also ==
- List of places on the State Register of Heritage Places in the City of Albany
