= Michaelmas Island =

Island in Western Australia

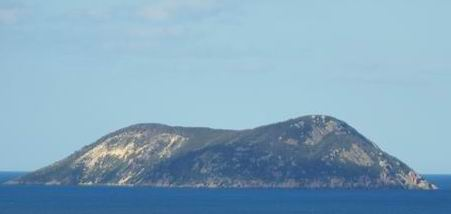
- Michaelmas Island from Mount Clarence in Albany, Western Australia

Geography
- Coordinates: 35°02′37.74″S 118°02′21.26″E

Administration
- Australia

Michaelmas Island is an island located in King George Sound near Albany, Western Australia.

The island is a nature reserve, declared in 1983, and managed by the Department of Parks and Wildlife; its reserve number is 30049. The island is also registered as a national estate. The island is 91.9 hectares (227 acres) in area.

Michaelmas Island has steep rocky shores with submerged reefs all along its northern southern and eastern sides in depths up to 30 metres (100 ft) with large granite boulders. The faces are covered in a diverse range in corals and sponges and home to a wide variety of marine life. Cheynes III, a whale chaser that was scuttled in 1982, is located off the western side of the island and is regarded highly as a diving site. Michaelmas Island is an important habitat for both resident and migratory birds. The habitat of these species is threatened by weed invasion such as taylorina and feral animals such as rats.

George Vancouver named many of the landforms around Albany when he entered King George Sound in 1791, including Michaelmas Island (discovered on Michaelmas Day), King George Sound, Breaksea Island, Oyster Harbour and Point Possession. Vancouver described the island as being covered in rich grasses and other vegetables. Before leaving, he planted some vine cuttings, some watercresses, and sowed various seeds. Matthew Flinders landed on the island in 1801 and reported the island to be covered in wiry grasses and stunted shrubs, and that it was covered in rat holes.

In 2016 the island was chosen as a new habitat site for the critically endangered Gilbert's potoroo. The island's lack of predators was a key factor in its selection, which will provide the Gilbert's potoroo with a similar level of long-term protection enjoyed by the quokkas of Rottnest Island, also in Western Australia.

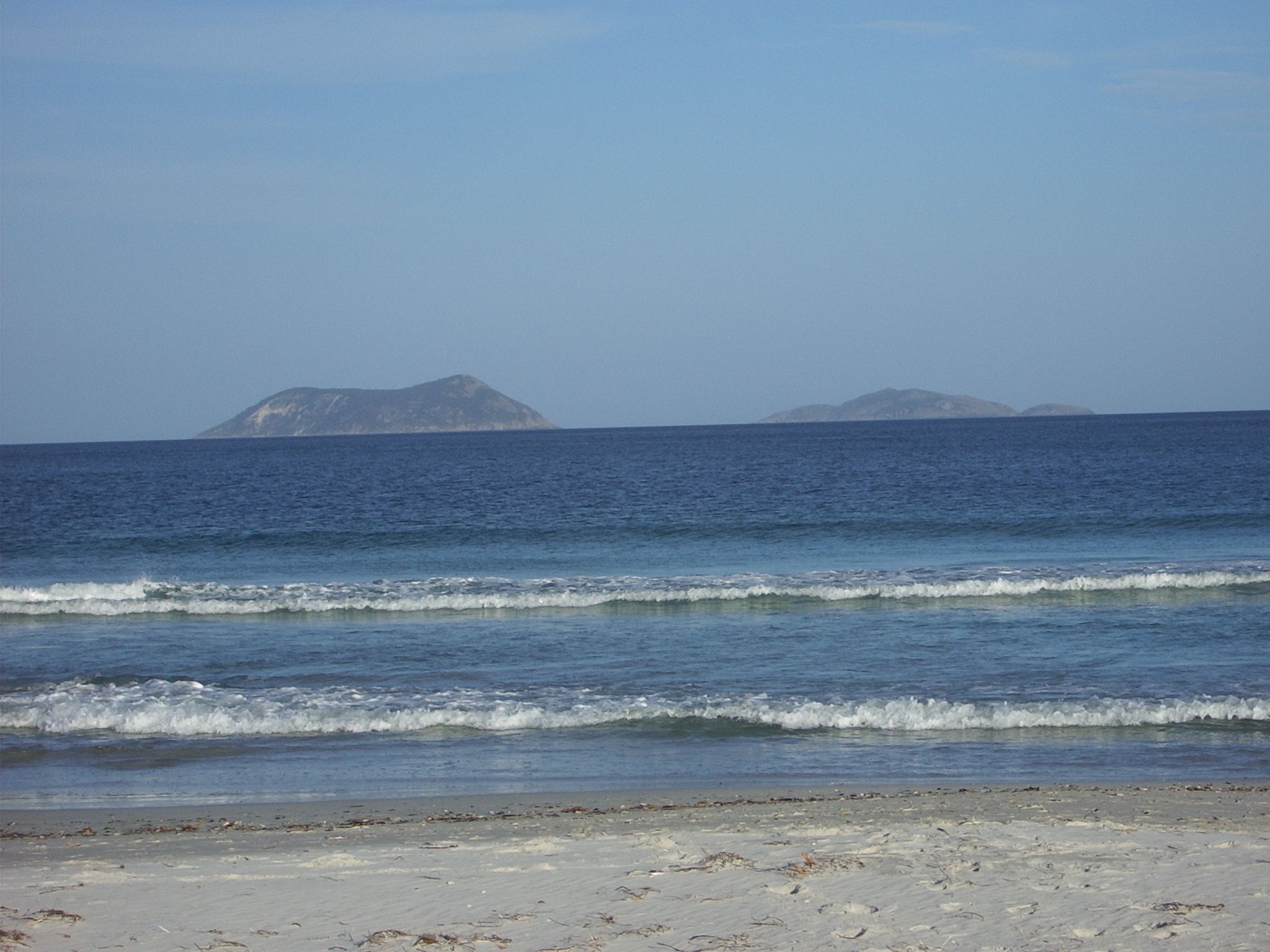
Michaelmas Island (left) and Breaksea Island (right) as viewed from Middleton Beach, Albany

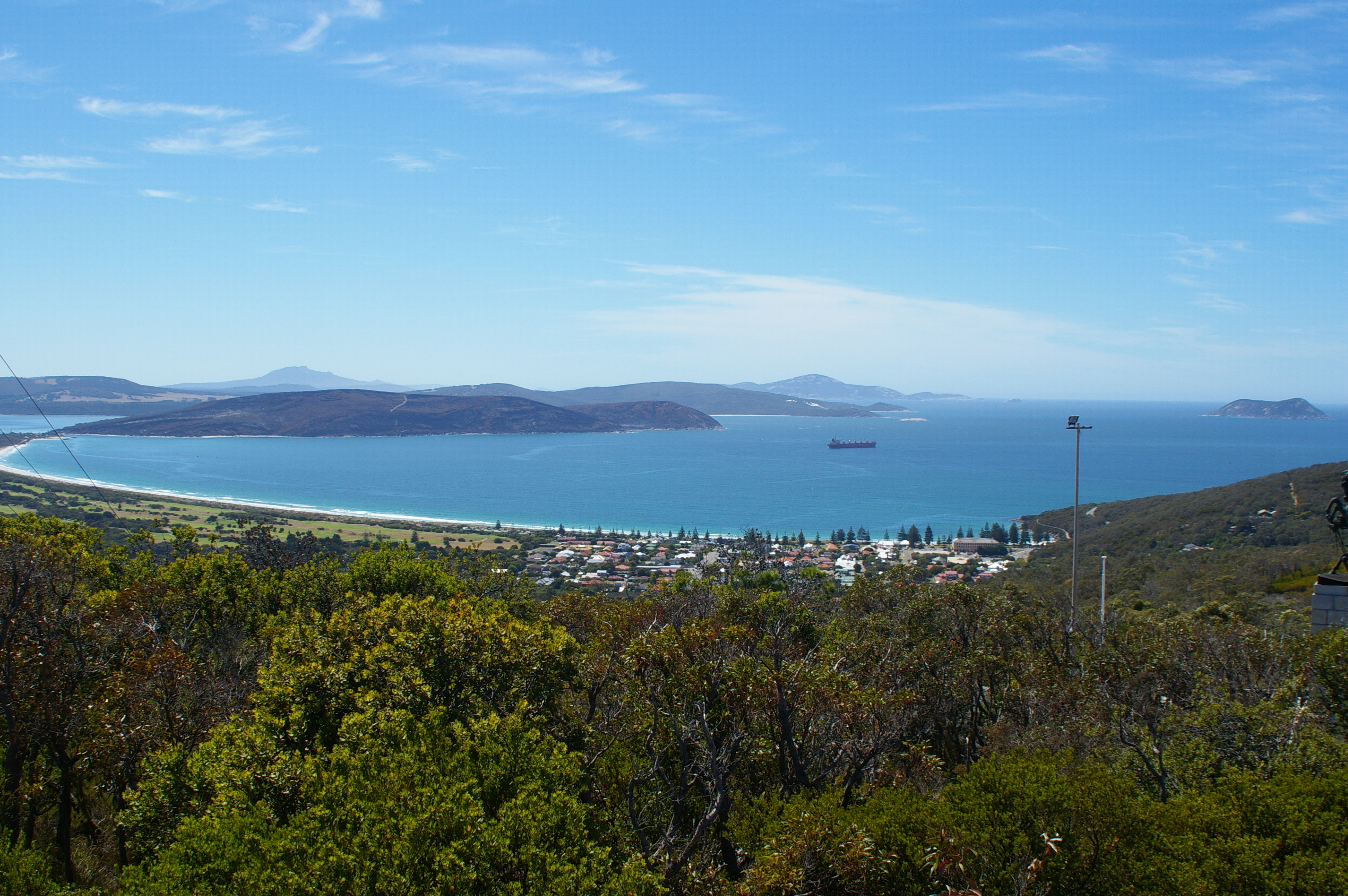
King George Sound as viewed from Mount Clarence, Albany
