= King George Sound =

Large body of water in southern Western Australia

- Mammang-Koort (Menang Noongar)
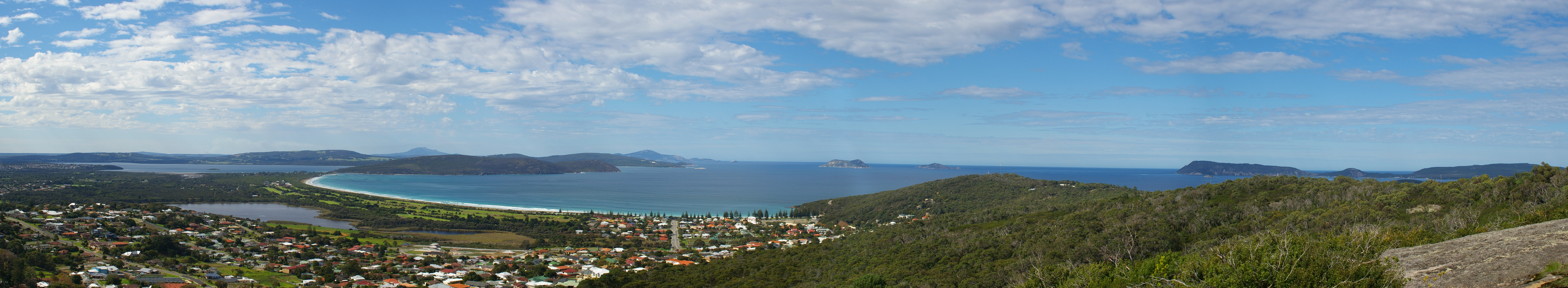
- King George Sound from Mount Clarence
- Interactive map of King George Sound
- Coordinates: 35°02′S 117°56′E
- Type: sound
- Part of: Indian Ocean
- Surface area: 110 km^{2} (42 sq mi)
- Max. depth: 35 m (115 ft)

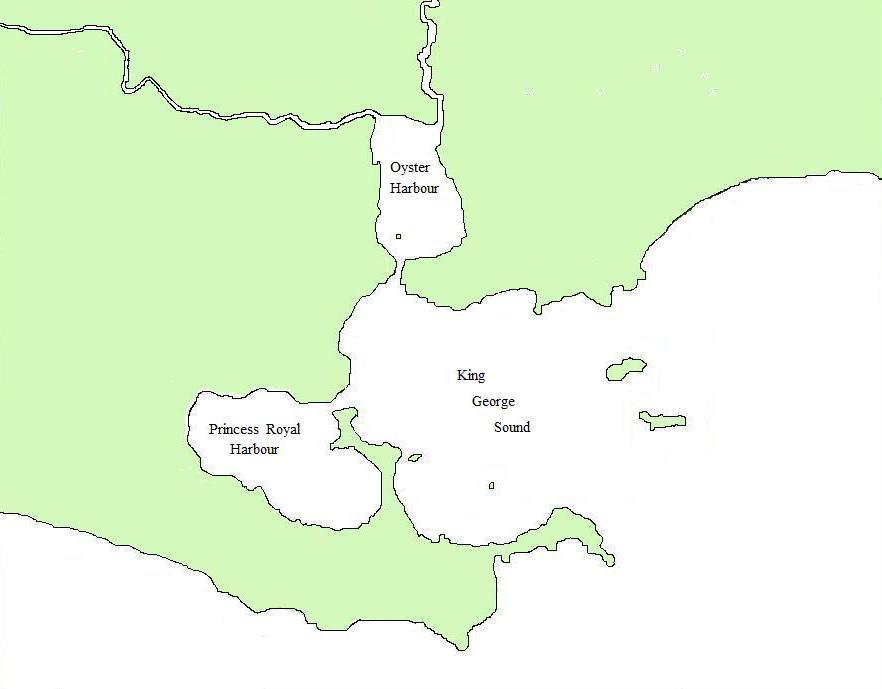
Mammang Koort / King George Sound

King George Sound (Menang Nyungar: Mammang-Koort) is a sound on the south coast of Western Australia. Named "King George the Third's Sound" by George Vancouver in 1791, it was referred to as "King George's Sound" from 1805. The name "King George Sound" gradually came into use from about 1934, prompted by new Admiralty charts supporting the intention to eliminate the possessive "s" from geographical names.

The sound covers an area of 110 square kilometres (42 sq mi) and varies in depth from 10 to 35 metres (33 to 115 ft). Situated at its western shore is the city of Albany. The sound is bordered by the mainland to the north, by Vancouver Peninsula on the west, and by Bald Head and Flinders Peninsula to the south. Although the sound is open water to the east, the waters are partially protected by Breaksea Island and Michaelmas Island. There are two harbours as extensions of the sound, Princess Royal Harbour to the west and Oyster Harbour to the north. Each receives excellent protection from winds and heavy seas. Princess Royal Harbour was Western Australia's only deep-water port for around 70 years until the Fremantle Inner Harbour was opened in 1897.

== History ==
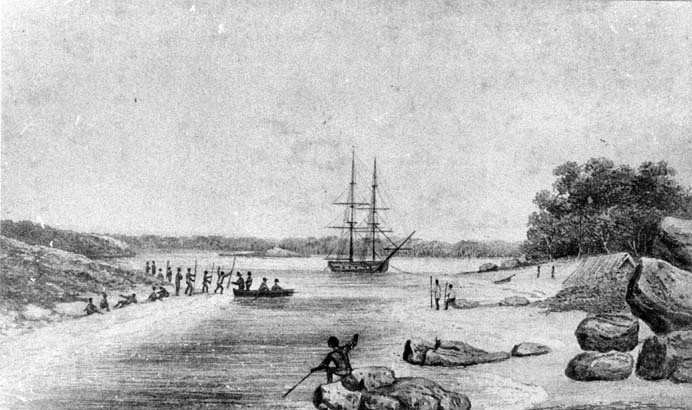
Phillip Parker King's 1818 sketch of Oyster Harbour

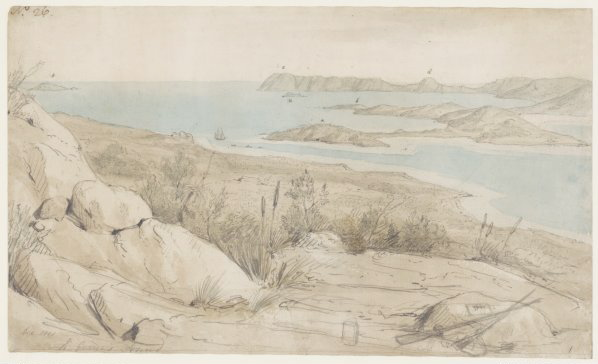
King George's Sound, view from the north-west, pencil and wash by William Westall in 1801

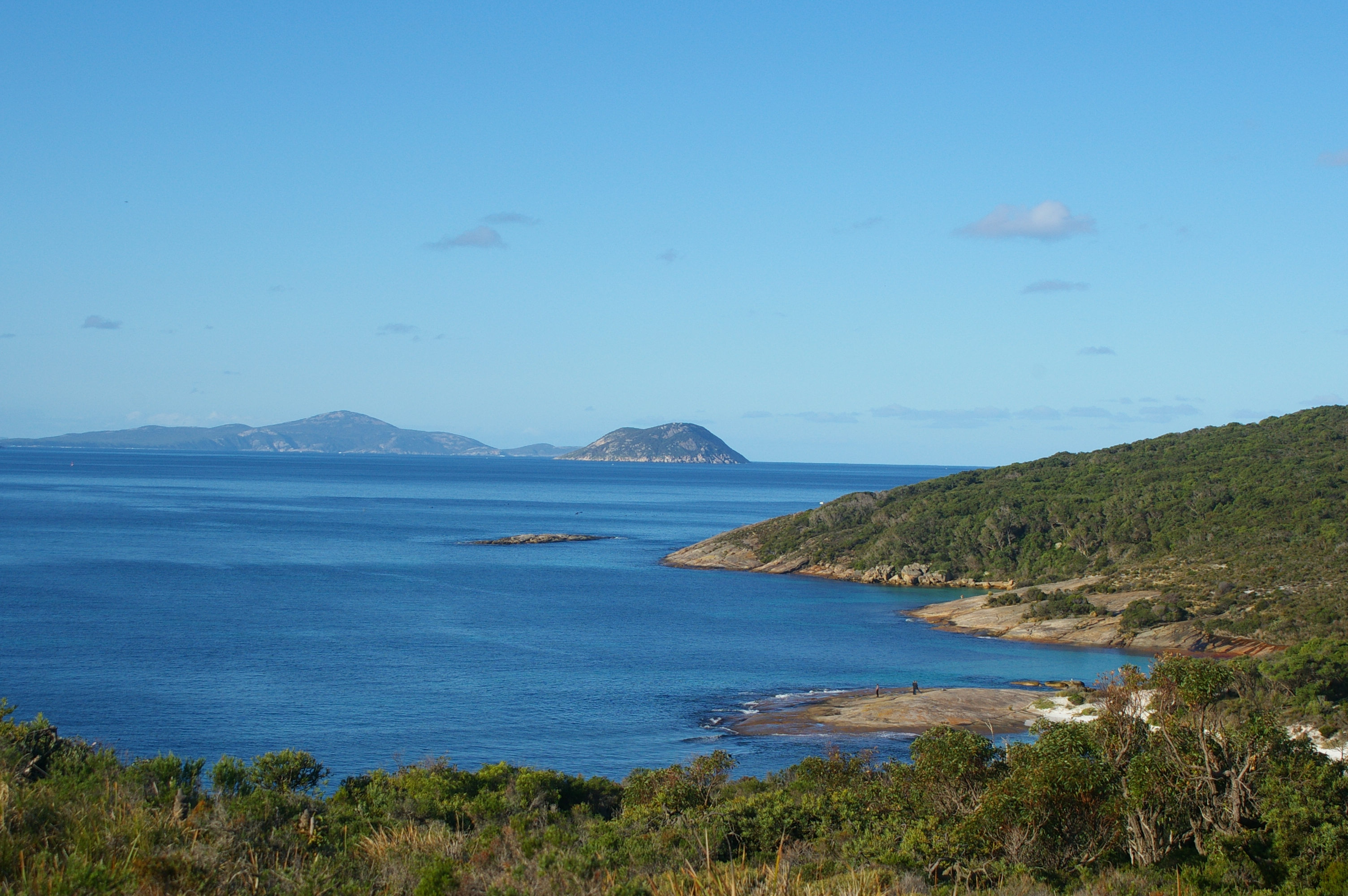
Whalers Beach looking out into King George Sound toward Michaelmas island taken from Vancouver Peninsula

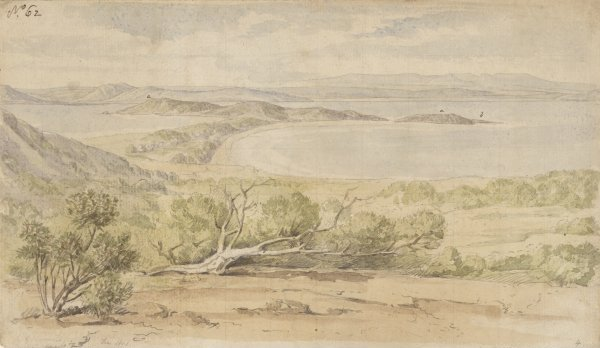
King George's Sound, view from Peak Head, by Westall

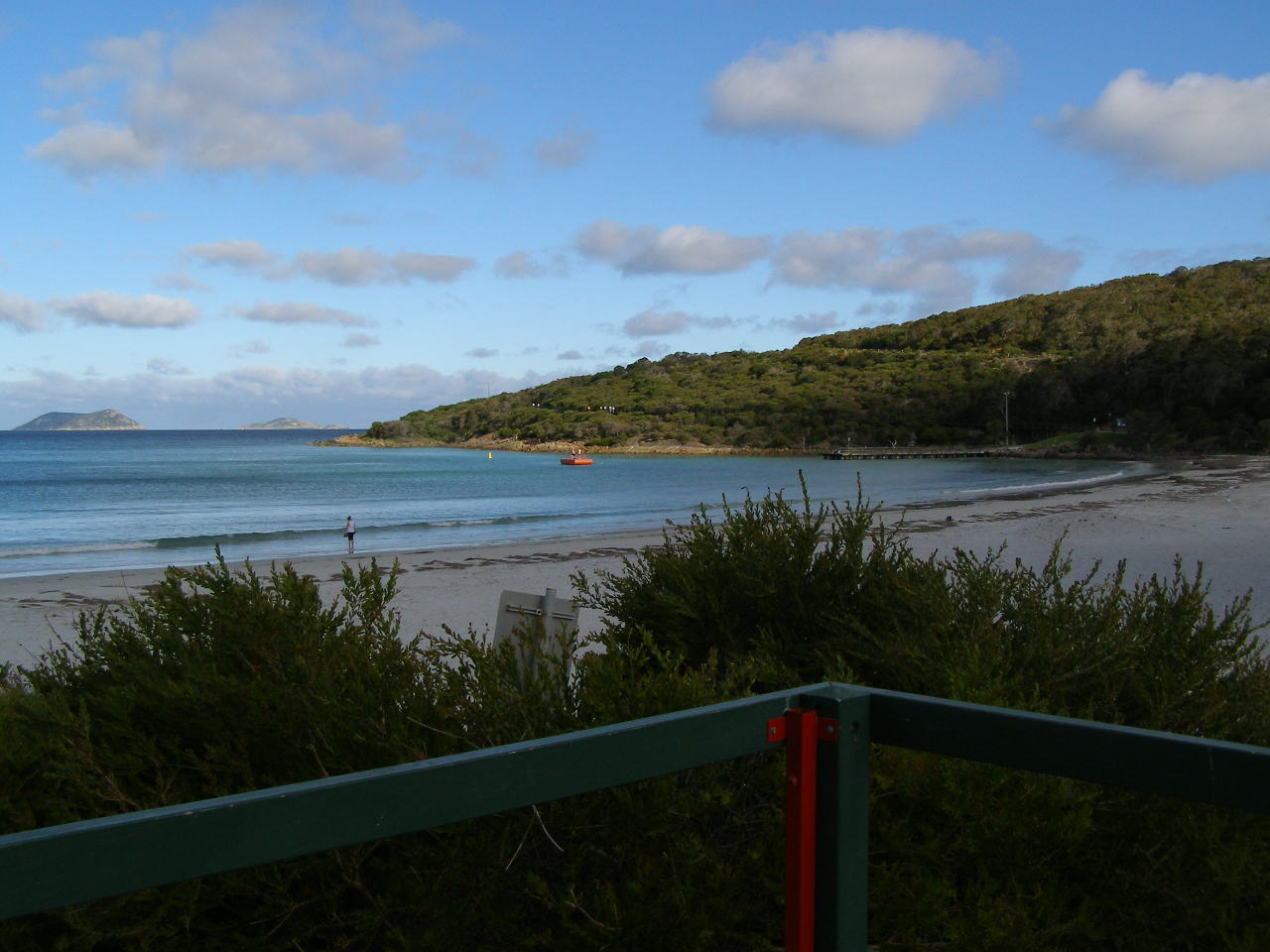
Binalup / Middleton Beach

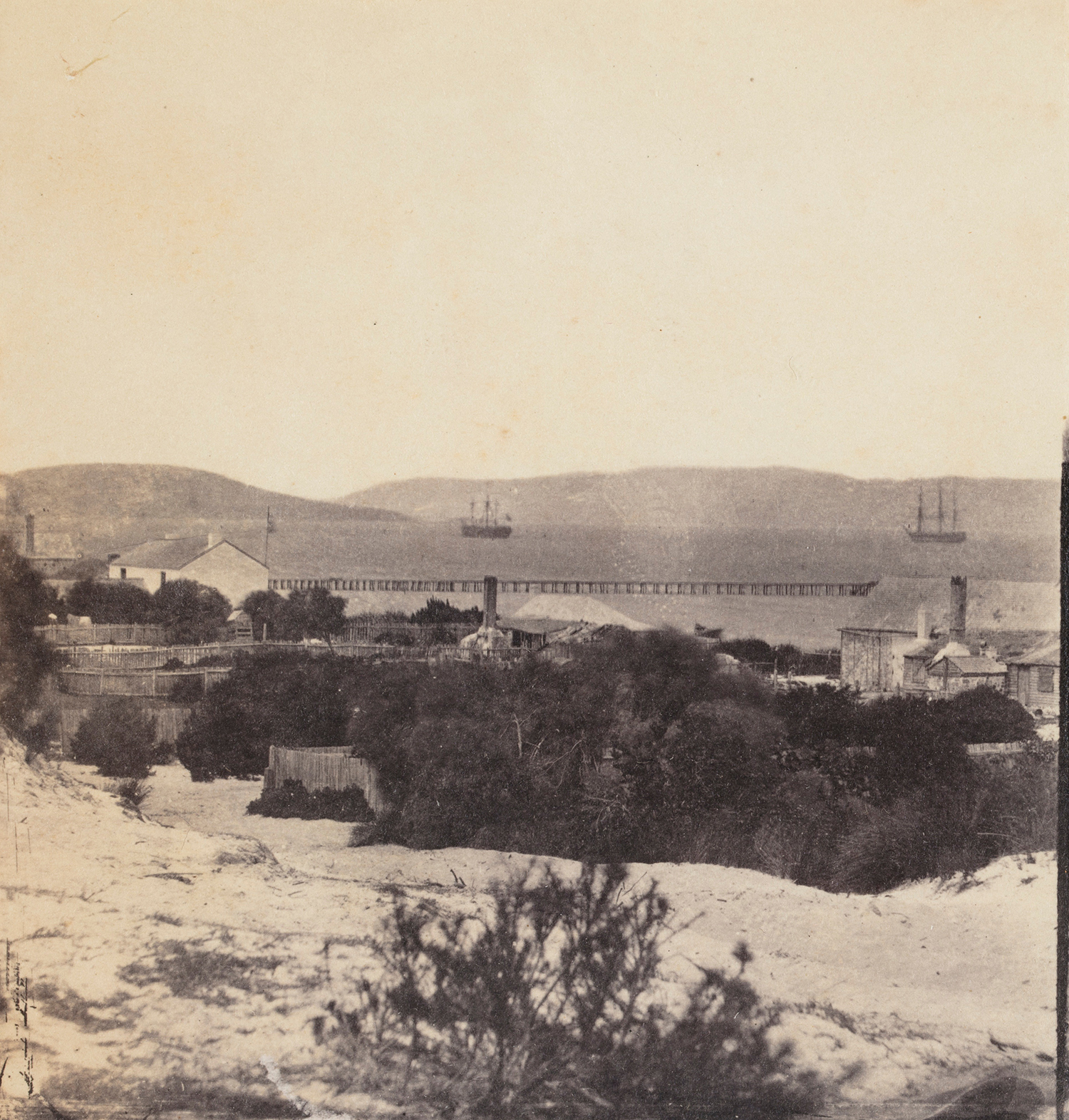
King Georges Sound and Albany, Western Australia, 1858

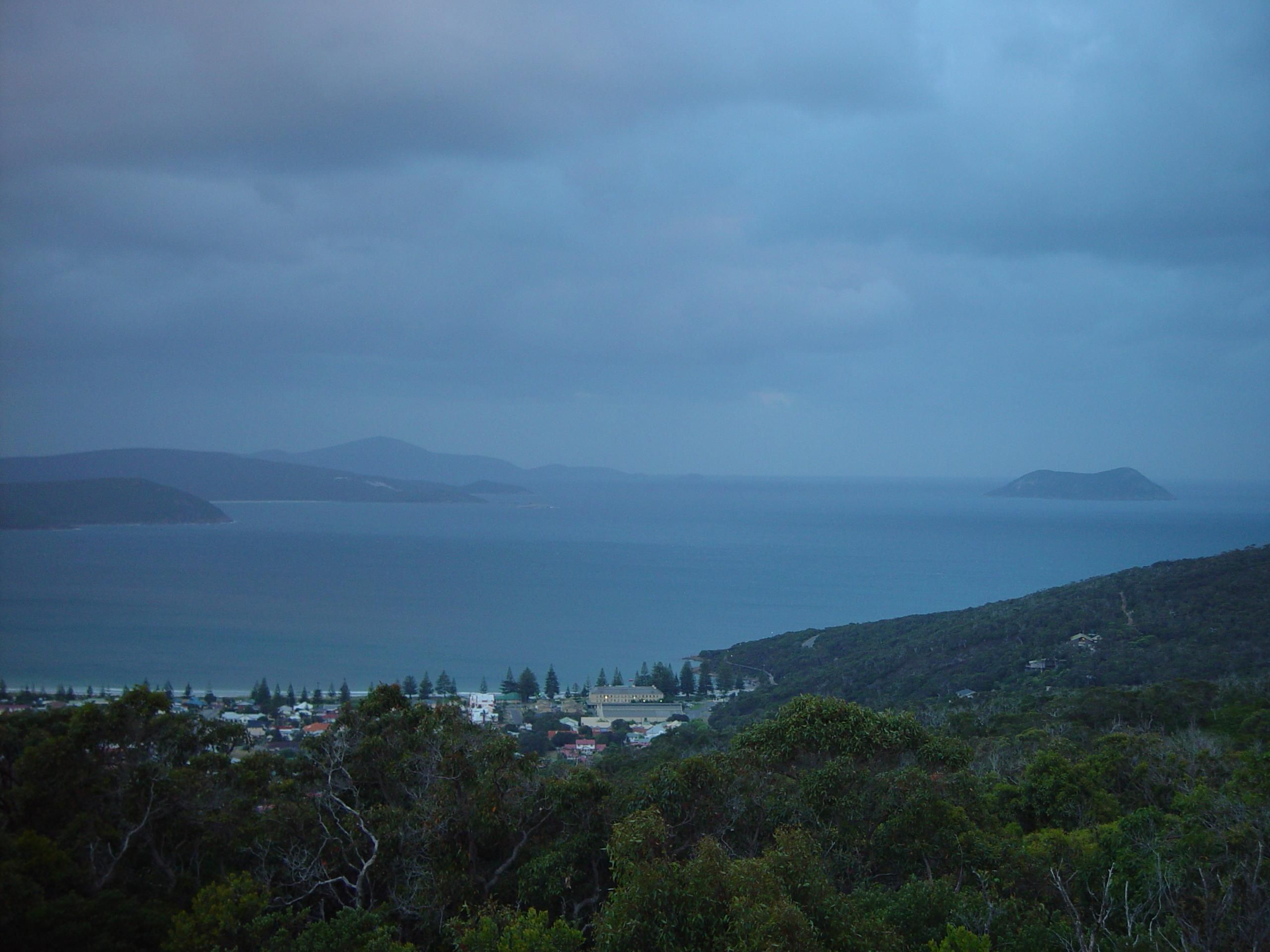
Islands and headlands of the Sound

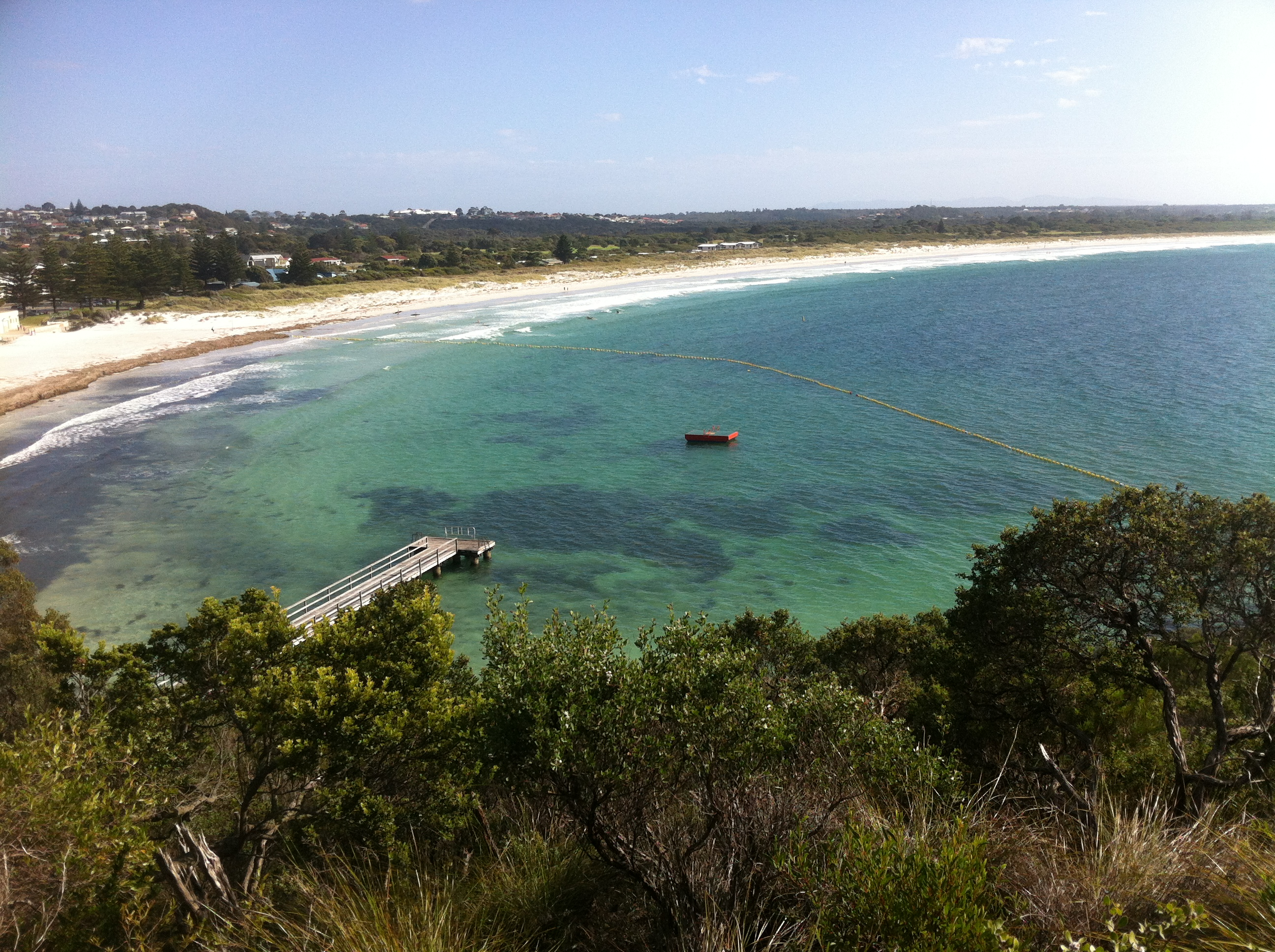
Yellow floats of Middleton Beach shark barrier March 2016

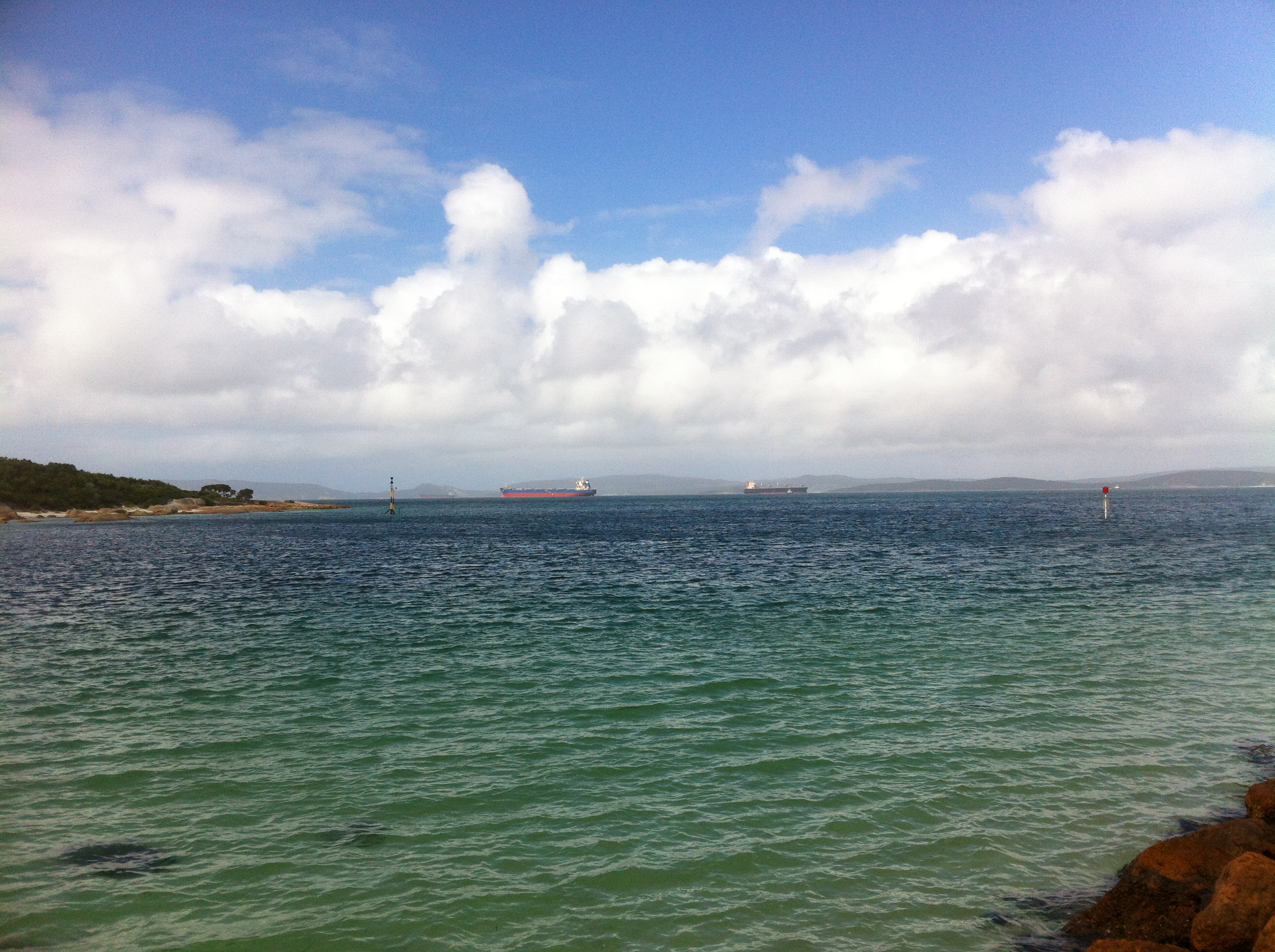
Bulk carriers in King George Sound

Whales breaching in King George Sound September 2015

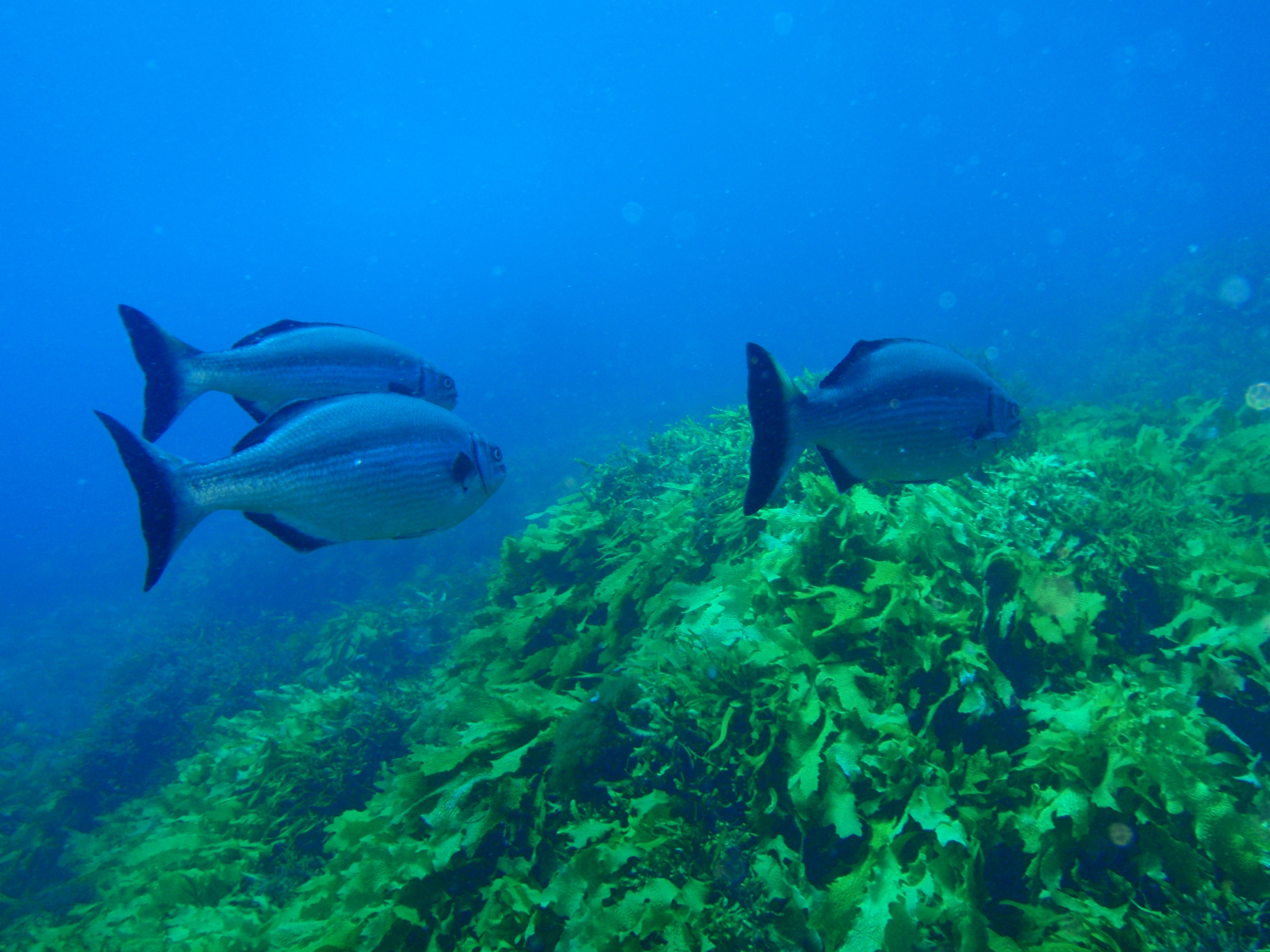
Silver drummer and buffalo bream

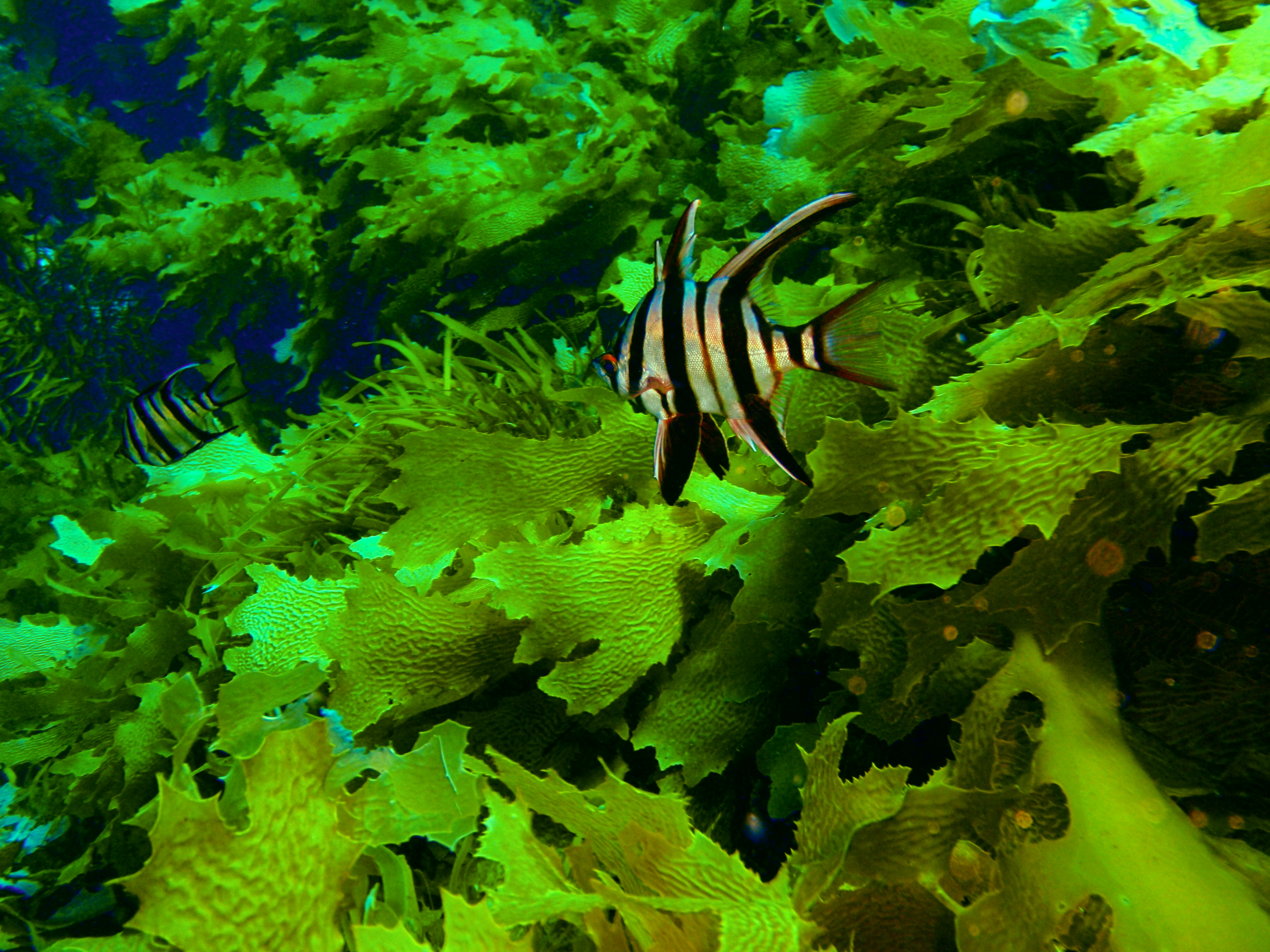
Old wife and seaweed

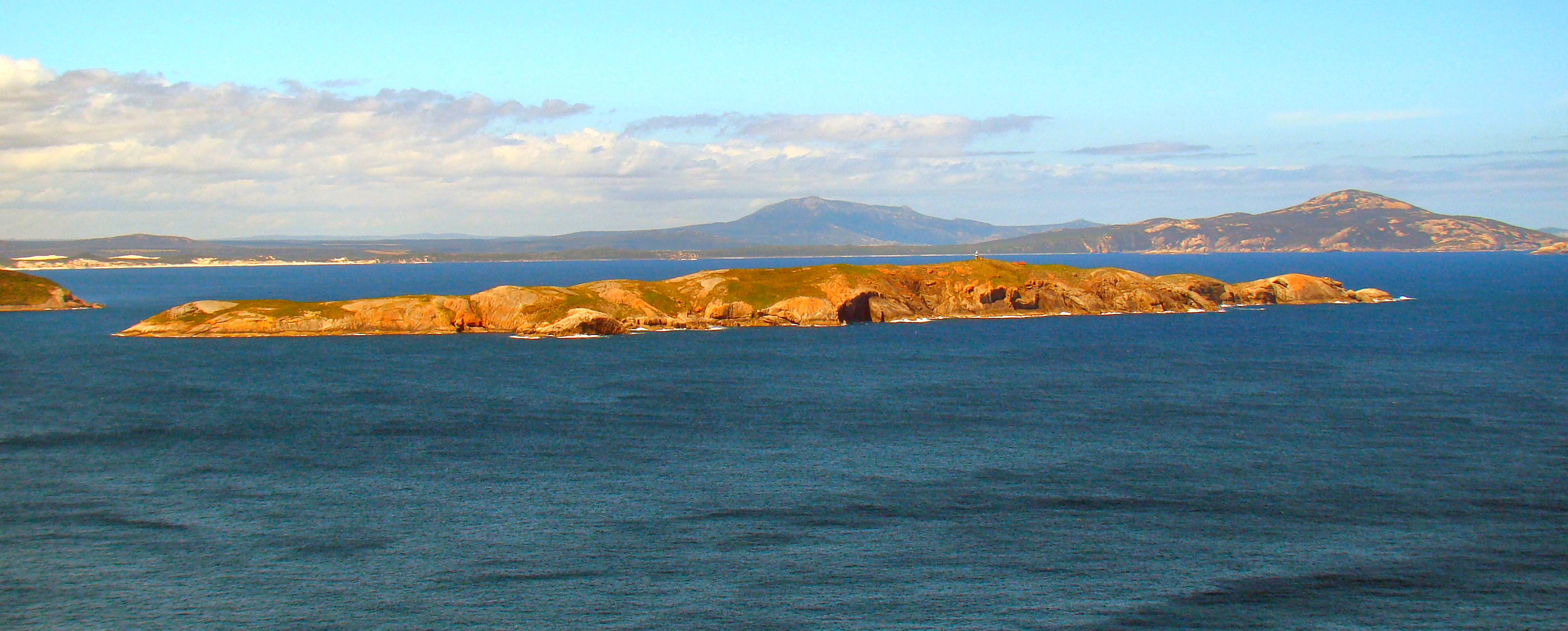
Breaksea Island in the Sound

The first reported visit to King George Sound by a European was in 1791 by the English explorer Captain George Vancouver. Vancouver named it King George the Third's Sound after the reigning monarch.

The next Europeans to visit the sound were Captain Dennis of the Kingston, and Captain Dixson of the Elligood. Kingston and Elligood were whalers and while there caught three whales. Dixson left an inscribed piece of copper plate behind.

Matthew Flinders anchored in the sound from 8 December 1801 to 5 January 1802 and explored the area. While he was there, his men found the copper plate Dixson had left. During this time Robert Brown (ship's botanist) and Peter Good (ship's gardener) collected samples of over 500 plant species.

Nicolas Baudin arrived in the sound in February 1803 aboard Géographe to rendezvous with Louis de Freycinet aboard the Casuarina before doing further exploration of the Western Australian coastline. During the course of their stay the ship's naturalist François Péron, collected 1060 new species of shellfish and a large number of starfish from the sound.

Phillip Parker King visited the sound in 1818 aboard the cutter HMS Mermaid while en route to conduct a nautical survey of the North West Cape, and Frenchman Dumont d'Urville visited it in 1826 aboard the Astrolabe.

On 25 December 1826, the New South Wales colonial government brig Amity, under the command of Major Edmund Lockyer, arrived at King George Sound to establish a possessory military and penal settlement. The expedition from Sydney consisted of a detachment of twenty troops from the 39th Regiment, three women and twenty-three convicts to assist in establishing the settlement, and six months provisions. On 30 December, 1826 the troops and prisoners were disembarked, setting up camp and landing stores, as well as gathering materials to set up temporary huts.

As instructed by the Colonial Secretary, the Union Jack was raised and a "Feu de Joie" fired by the troops on 21 January, 1827, formally annexing the territory and Lockyer named his settlement Frederick Town after George III's second son, Prince Frederick, Duke of York and Albany, but this name never gained wide acceptance. Instead the settlement and surrounding locality were usually referred to as King George's Sound.

The settlement of King George's Sound was part of New South Wales – a semi-exclave of New South Wales – from its establishment until 7 March 1831. It then was made part of the Swan River Colony, which from 1833 has been known as Western Australia.

In 1832, Governor of Western Australia Captain (later Admiral) James Stirling declared the settlement a town and renamed it Albany, but the broader locality continued to be referred to as King George's Sound for many years.

In 1834 Robert Dale published in London a panorama print of the view from Mount Clarence accompanied by a pamphlet describing the sound and the geography, geology, flora, fauna and native inhabitants of the immediate region.

On 8 March 1836, HMS Beagle visited King George Sound and anchored there for eight days. On board was the young naturalist Charles Darwin, who collected specimens on shore. Beagle was on the homeward leg of her celebrated circumnavigation of the world, having already stopped off at Sydney.

Until the construction of Fremantle Harbour in 1897, King George Sound contained the only deepwater port in Western Australia, and so was the favoured location for delivery of mail and supplies from abroad to Western Australia. These were then transported to Perth and Fremantle by road or coastal shipping until the early 1890s, when the completion of the Great Southern Railway provided a quicker service.

Albany Port is located on the north shore of Princess Royal Harbour adjacent to the city of Albany. The port was first established in 1826 and has been expanded regularly since. The port now has five berths able to cater to panamax class vessels. The port typically caters for loading of about 120 vessels per annum.

In 1914, King George Sound was the last Australian anchorage for the fleet taking the first Australian and New Zealand soldiers, later to become known as Anzacs, to Egypt. A memorial to the Anzacs of the Desert Mounted Corps has been established on top of Mount Clarence. Albany was where the first commemorative dawn service was held on Anzac Day, 25 April 1923. The contribution of Mustafa Kemal Atatürk, president of Turkey from 1923 until 1938 is recognised by naming the entrance into Princess Royal Harbour as Atatürk Entrance.

There is evidence that shore-based bay whaling was carried out in Barker Bay, by James Daniels, as early as 1849. Whaling ships from Hobart also visited the area in the 2nd half of the 19th century. The Cheyne Beach Whaling Company began operating out of Frenchman Bay, located within the sound, in 1952 with a small quota of 50 humpback whales that was eventually increased to 175. At the peak of the whaling activity in the sound the company was taking between 900 and 1100 sperm and humpback whales in a year. Humpback whaling was banned in 1963 which in turn decreased the viability of the operation.

In 1978 the Cheynes Beach Whaling Company closed down after increasing environmental lobby group pressure. It was Australia's last coastal whaling company.

Installation of a shark barrier was commenced and completed in March 2016 at Middleton Beach at the north western end of the sound.

The sound was renamed to the dual name by the City of Albany and Landgate.

== Flora ==
Dense seagrass beds still exist in King George Sound, although they have been adversely affected by increased nutrient levels and industry in the area. Some of the seagrasses present in the sound include Posidonia australis, Posidonia robertsoneae, Posidonia kirkmanii, Posidonia sinuosa, Posidonia denhartogii, Posidonia ostenfeldii, Amphibolis antarctica, Amphibolis griffithii, Halophila australis, Halophila ovalis, Ruppia megacarpa and Heterozostera tasmanica.

The fringing vegetation around the sound includes both the saltmarshes of Oyster Harbour and Princess Royal Harbour, and the sandy beach vegetation. Saltmarshes contain a variety of species including samphire, seablite, astartea, wattle, greenbush, shore rush, twig rush and saltwater paperbark. Freshwater species also occur in areas where substantial freshwater seepage occurs. Sandy beach areas contain a mix of shrubs and sedges such as the grey white cushion bush, coast sword sedge, knotted club rush, sea rocket, pigface and false caper.

== Fauna ==
The sound comprises a wide variety of habitats that supports an abundance of marine life. Many species of corals are present including Turbinaria frondens, Turbinaria mesenterina and Turbinaria renformis which cover an extensive area. Other coral species that can be found include Scolymia australis, Plesiastrea versipora, Coscinaraea mcneilli and Coscinaraea marshae.

A large, wild mussel population was known to exist in the sound, and now commercial mussel farms operate within the area that grow and harvest Blue mussels.

It is estimated that 203 species of fish inhabit the Oyster Harbour, Princess Royal Harbour and King George Sound, with Australian pilchards Sardinops sagax neopilchardus making up 97% of the total fish catch. Other species that are commonly found include Australian herring, leatherjackets, cobbler, tailor, Australian anchovy, garfish, sand trevally, tarwhine, flathead, tuna, snapper, Australian salmon, yellowtail scad, sea mullet, striped trumpeter, long-toothed flounder, dusky morwong and long-finned goby. The King George whiting (Sillaginodes punctatus) was first named by Cuvier in 1829 as Sillago punctata, based on an individual taken from King George Sound.

Seals are known to inhabit the sound in various locations along the coast and on the islands. The species that are sighted most often are the Australian sea lion and the New Zealand fur seal. Species that have been sighted, but are considered to be occasional visitors, include the subantarctic fur seal and the leopard seal.

Dolphins are also found in the area, and are occasionally caught and drowned in fishing nets or stranded. The common dolphin Delphinus delphis and the bottlenose dolphin Tursiops truncatus have both been recorded in the area.

Southern right whales and humpback whales frequent the area between July and October when they congregate to mate and calve in the protected waters of the sound. Other whales that have been spotted in the area include minke whales, blue whales, short-finned pilot whales, false killer whales and killer whales. Sperm whales were known to visit the sound during the whaling era but none have been sighted recently, although a pod was detected further out in the Southern Ocean in 2002.

The sound becomes a perfect habitat for migratory wading birds during the summer, when an estimated 2,000-3,000 birds flock to the area to feed in the shallow mudflats of the harbours. Some of the species that can be found during the summer months include the red-necked stint and the red knot as well as sandpipers, grey plovers, red capped plovers, lesser sand plovers, grey-tailed tattlers, Eurasian whimbrels, common greenshanks, yellow-billed spoonbill, white-faced heron and stilts. Other birds that are commonly seen around the sound include cormorants, pied oystercatchers, sooty oystercatchers, Pacific gulls, Caspian terns, pelicans, ospreys and white-bellied sea eagles.

== Geology ==
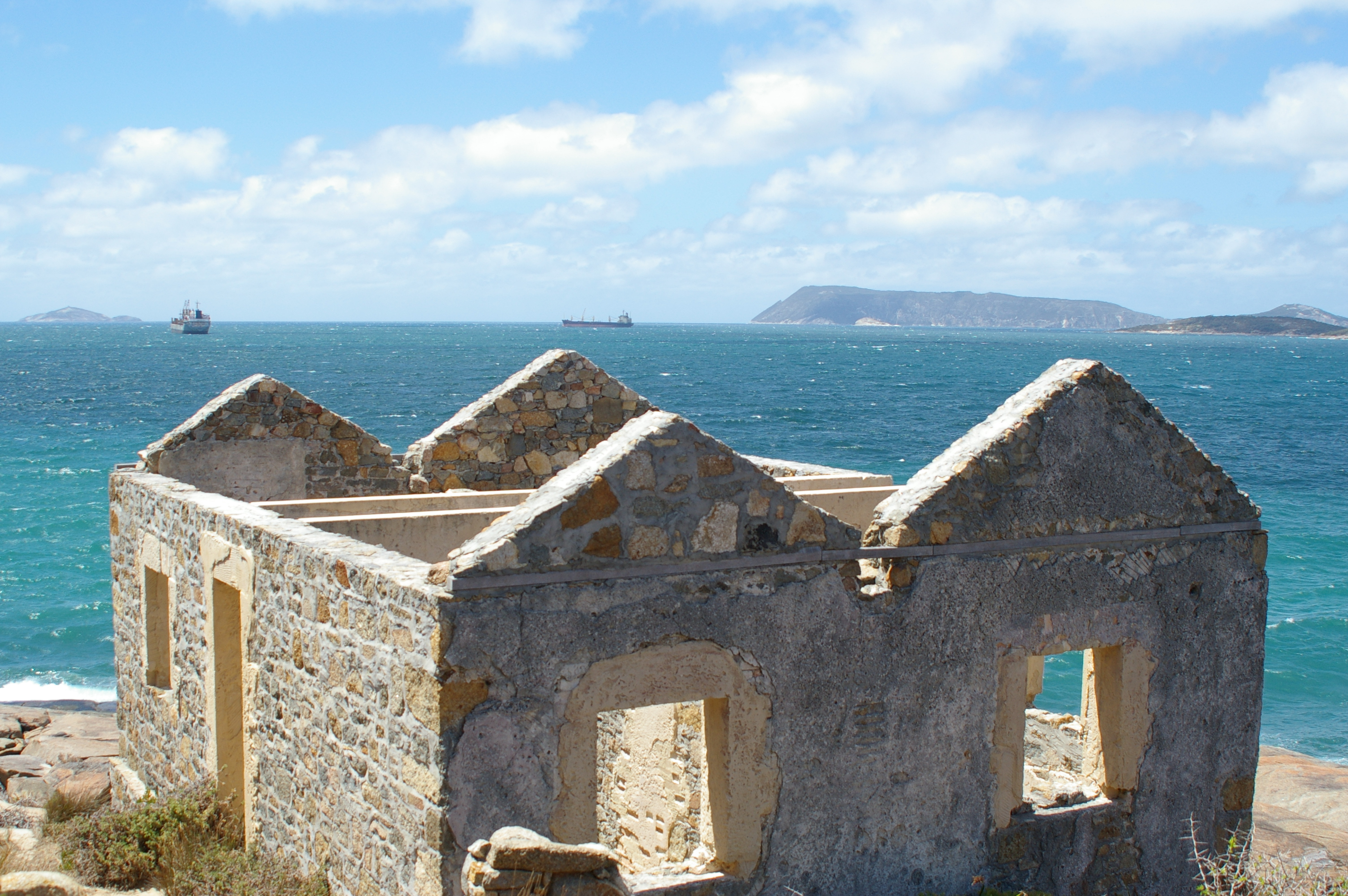
Point King, granite headland

The Western Australian south coast is formed along the edge of the southern margin of the Yilgarn craton and is fringed with prominent headlands composed of granite and gneisses formed during Proterozoic tectonic activity. Arcuate Bays that contain beaches backed by holocene dunes are found between the headlands.

King George Sound includes many islands and some islets, all comprising granitoid rocks with accumulations of soil on most.

Islands of note include Breaksea Island, Michaelmas Island, Seal Island, Mistaken Island, and Green Island.

== Oceanography ==
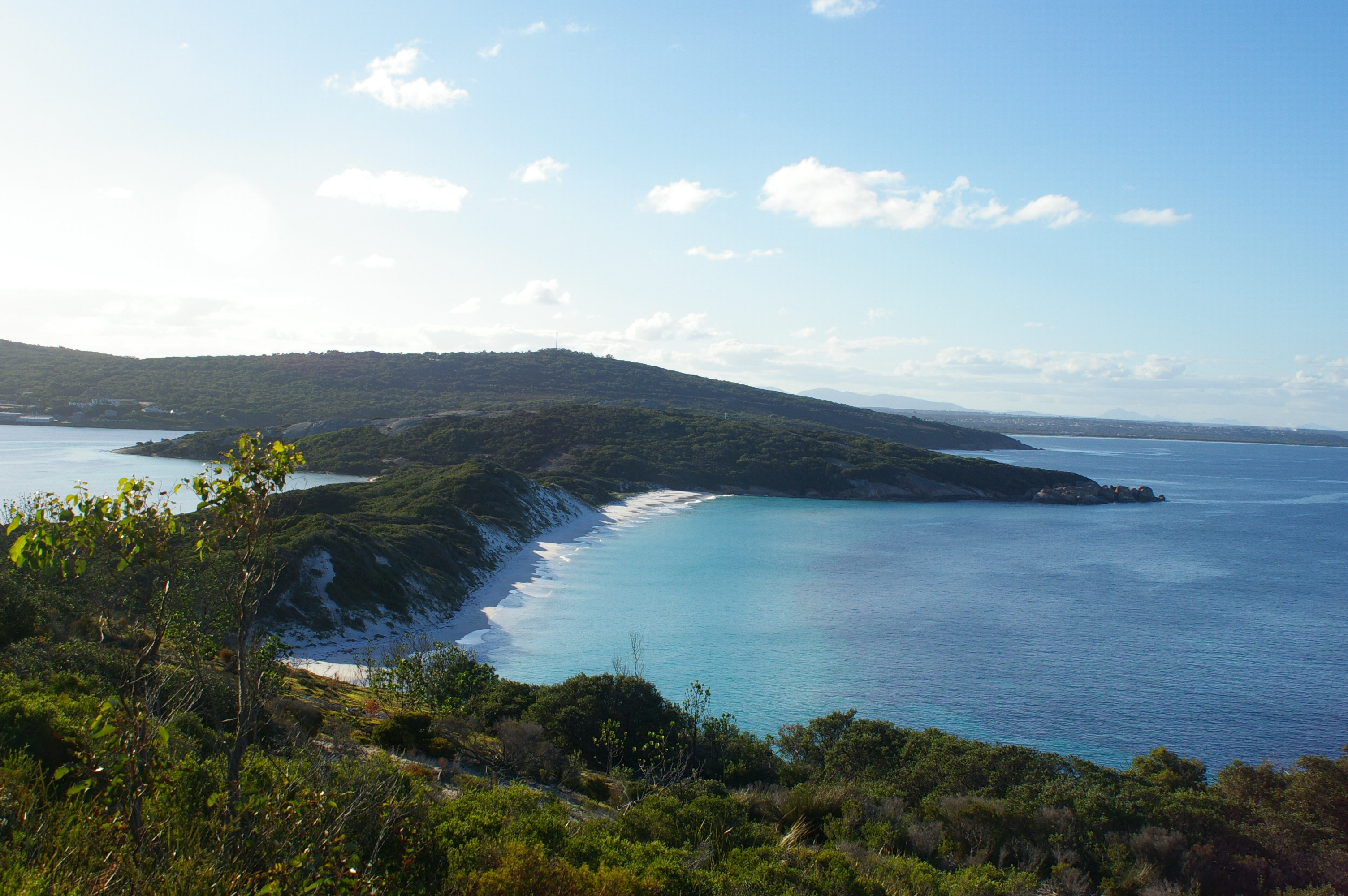
Point Possession

The tidal range in King George Sound (including Princess Royal Harbour and Oyster Harbour) is 0.4 metres (1 ft) with spring tidal range of 1.1 metres (4 ft). Tidal levels can remain static for periods of time. Semi-diurnal tides are frequent and diurnal tides are occasional.

The temperature of the water in the sound is slightly different from that of the open sea.

Location	Mean summer temp (°C)	Mean winter temp (°C)
Open sea	20.1	17.3
King George Sound	20.5	13.6

The salinity level within the Sound remains relatively constant ranging between 34.8 and 35.5 '‰', the lower levels occurring during heavy winter rain events when large volumes of freshwater enter the sound from the King and Kalgan rivers.

The Leeuwin Current exerts some influence in the sound as it flows eastwards along the continental shelf in the main part of the sound.

== Modern Representation ==
The region of King George sound was featured in Kim Scott's 2010 novel, 'That Deadman Dance', which describes interaction and colonialism in 'the friendly frontier'. The story follows a number of nuanced characters, both of European and indigenous Noongar heritage. The main settlement, King George Town, at the time of the book is described as a 'fledgling Australian town', which features a series of small residences and a public house owned by former soldier Alexander Killam.

== Shipwrecks ==
Many wrecks exist within King George Sound. The most recent and best known is the 133 metres (436 ft) guided missile destroyer HMAS Perth, which was scuttled in 2001 in 35 metres (115 ft) of water off Seal Island, to be used as a dive-site.

The former whale chaser Cheynes was sold for scrap in 1961 and was subsequently sunk between Michaelmas Island and the northern shoreline of the sound. Another chaser in the fleet, Cheynes II, was blown ashore on Geak Point near Quaranup in Princess Royal Harbour in 1990 and is still there, approximately 290 metres (951 ft) off-shore.

The Lady Lyttleton sank in the Emu Point channel when repairs were attempted in 1867.

A Hobart wooden barque, the Fanny Nicholson was being used as a whaling vessel when it ran ashore during a gale in 1872. The remains can still be seen in shallow water in Frenchman Bay. Another Tasmanian whaling barque, the Runnymede, met a similar fate when it ran aground during a storm in 1881.

The wooden barque Athena sank in 1908, after being damaged in a fire.

Elvie, a flat-bottomed wooden lighter used to carry oil to the whaling station at Frenchman's Bay, blew ashore and wrecked in 1921.

In 1868, Northumberland, a wooden barque laden with 2000 tonnes of coal, grounded on a reef off Bald Head near the entrance to King George Sound. The ship was freed and sailed into the sound with a broken rudder, the crew eventually abandoned ship and took to the life boats. Northumberland foundered and sank between Cape Vancouver and Breaksea Island.

== Gallery ==
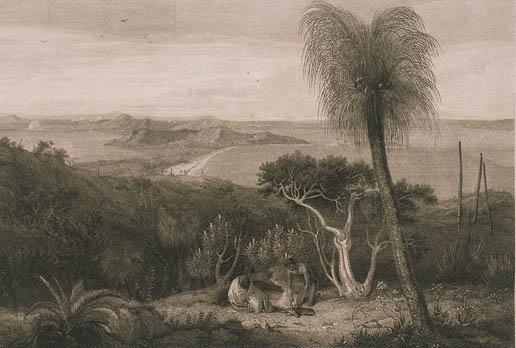
South side of King George's Sound, by Westall

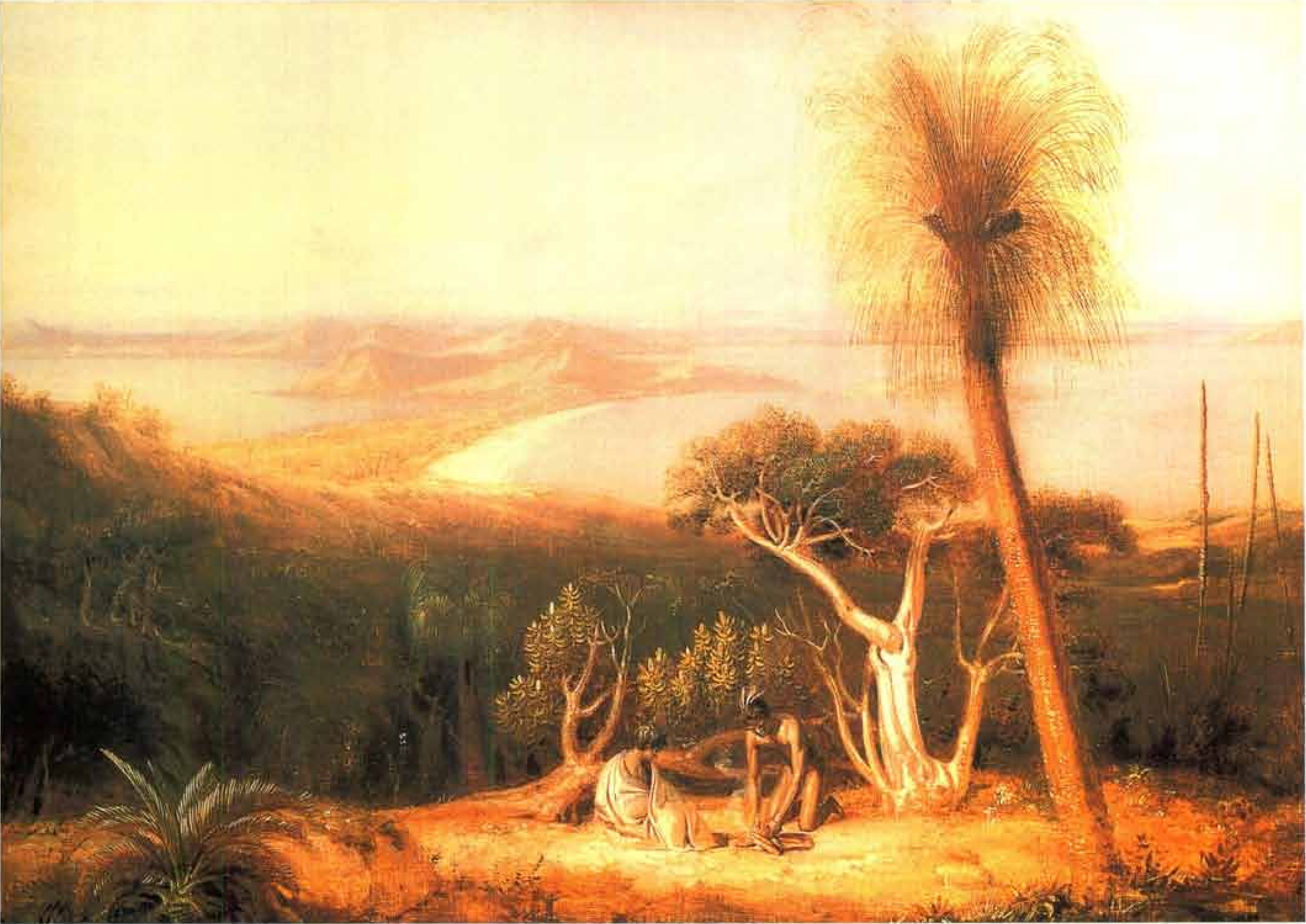
Part of King George III Sound, December 1801, by Westall

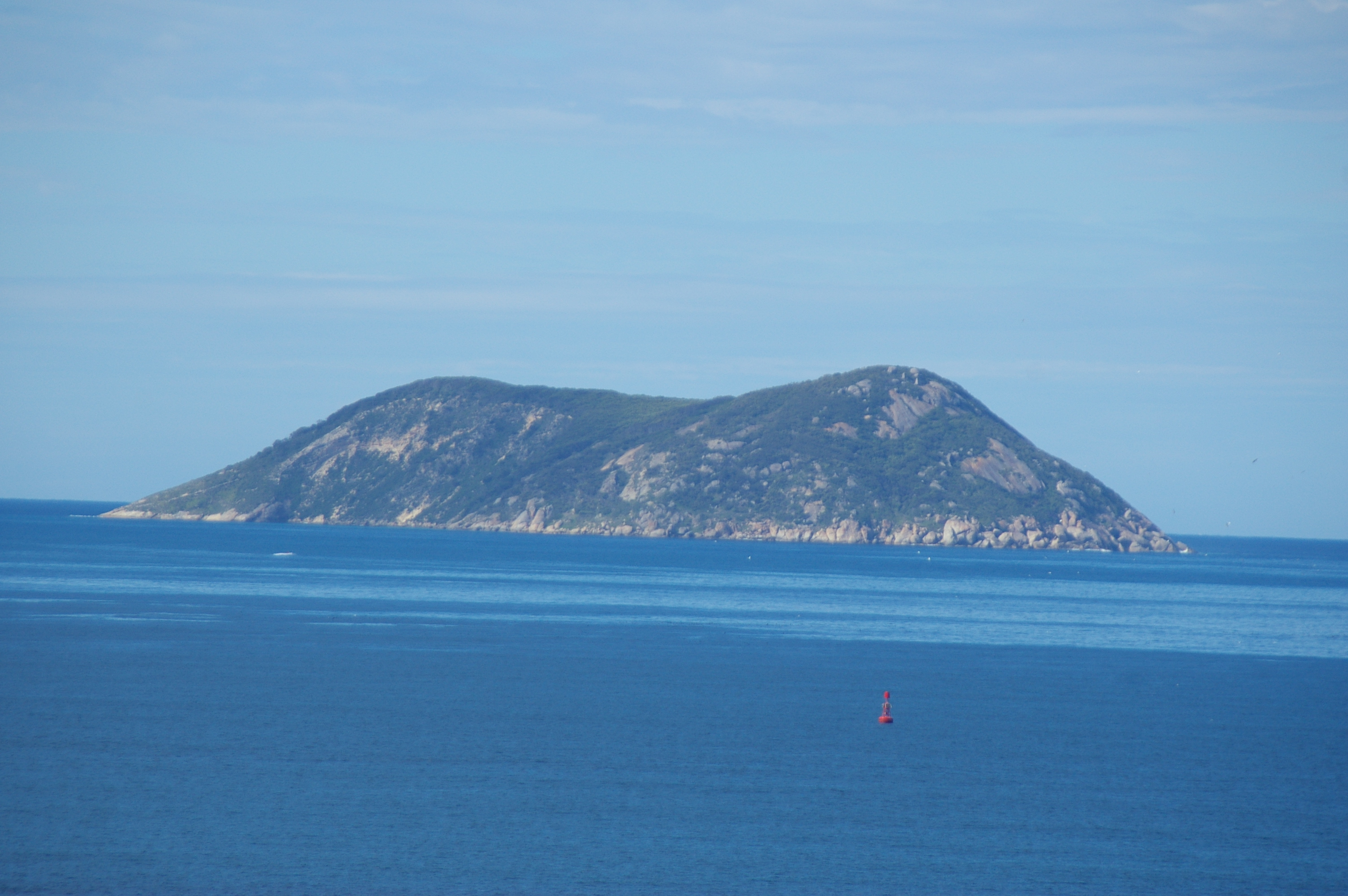
Michaelmas Island as viewed from Mount Clarence

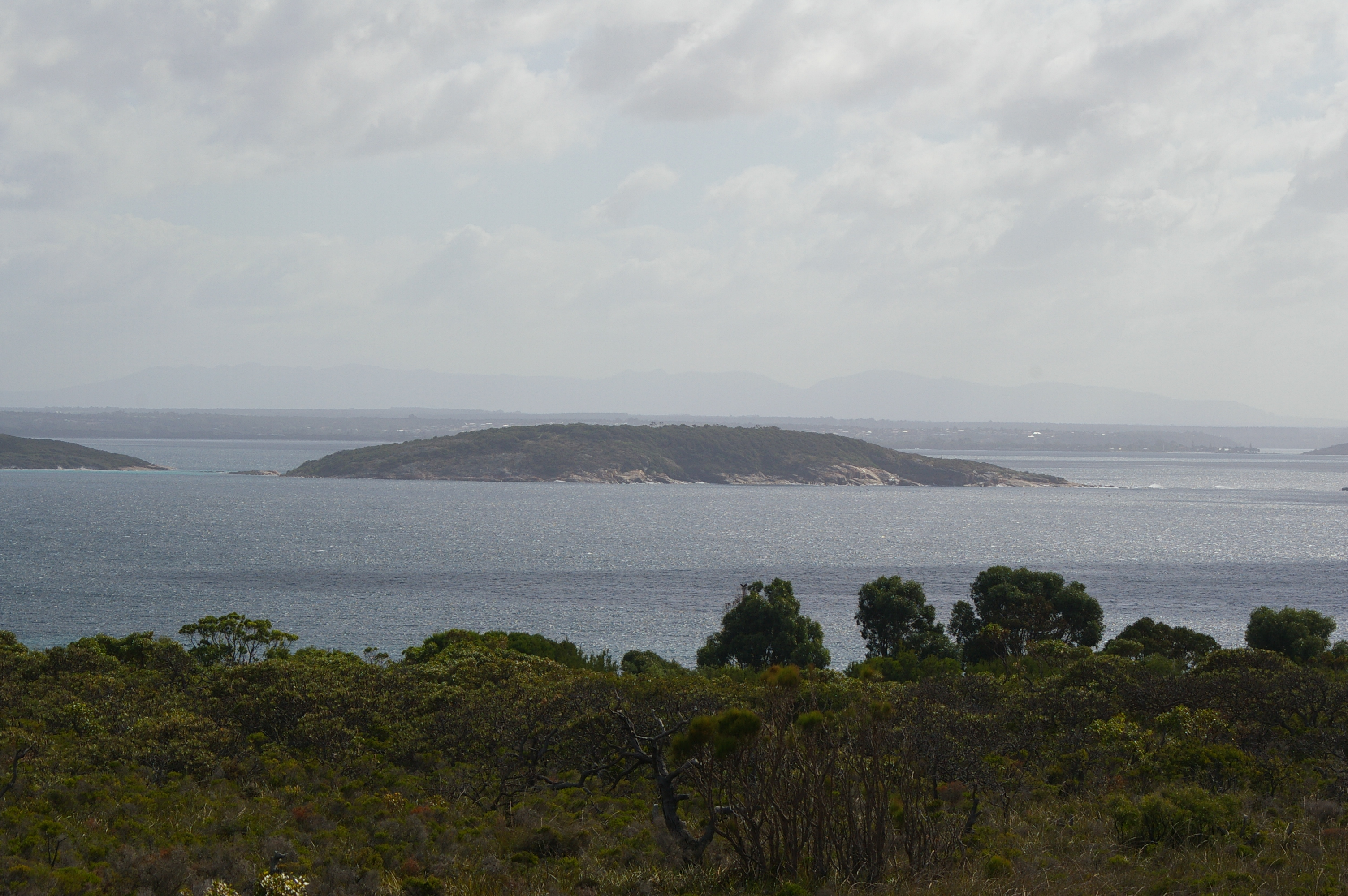
Mistaken Island from near Goode Beach

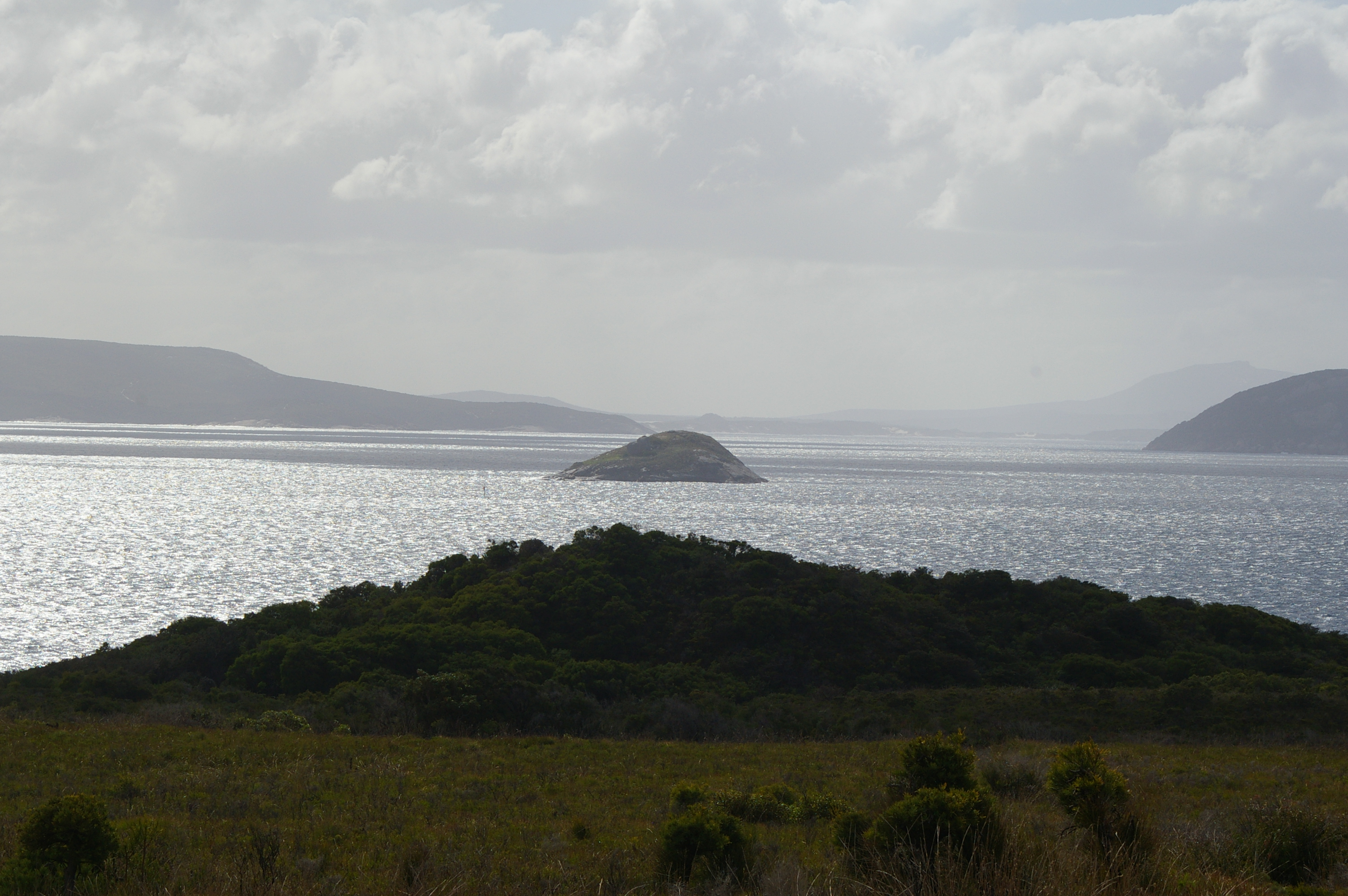
Seal Island from near Goode Beach

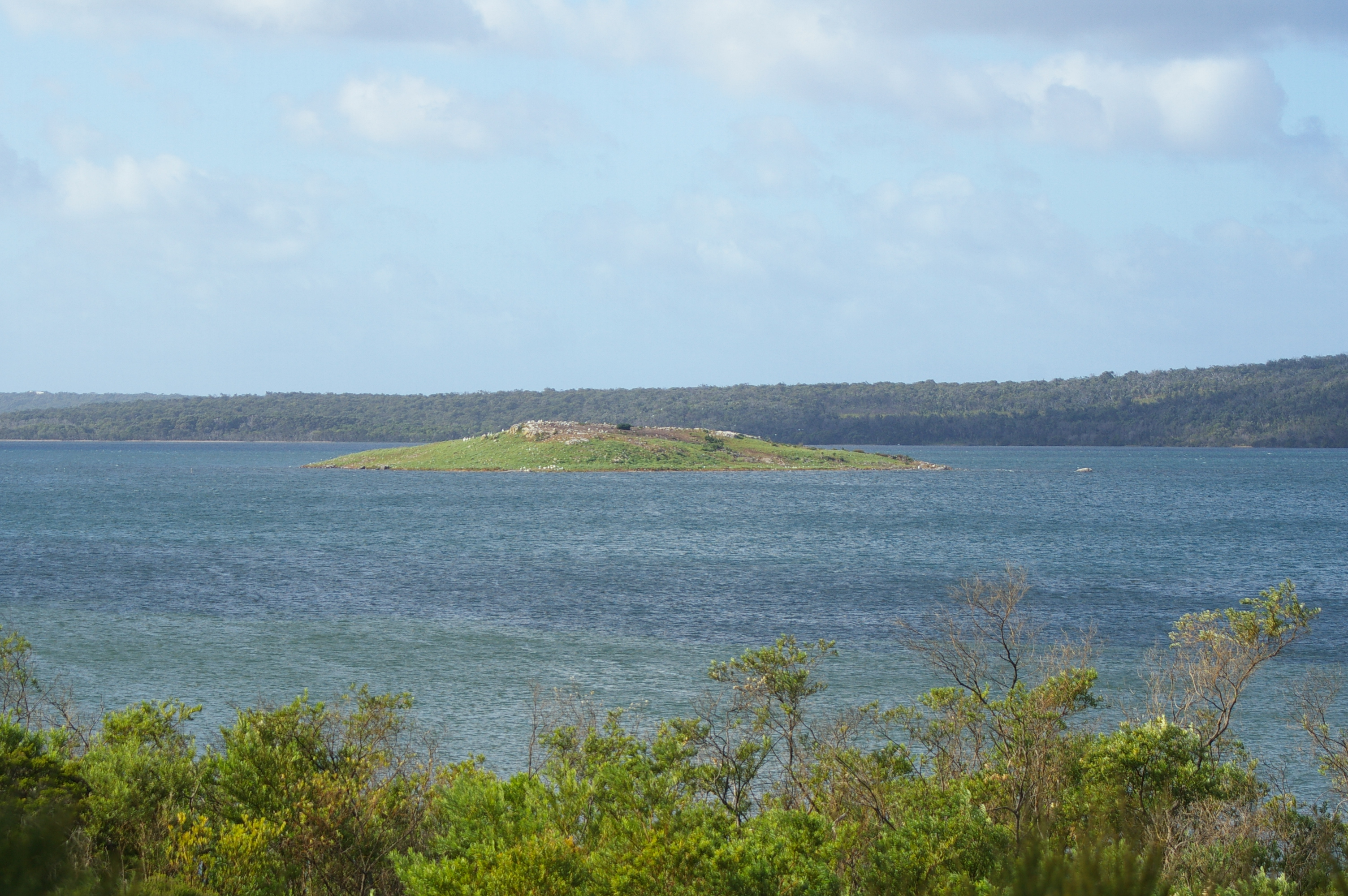
Green Island from Bayonet Head

== See also ==
- Port of Albany
- Whaling in Western Australia
- King George Sound (Tasmania)
