= Breaksea Island (Western Australia) =

Island in Western Australia

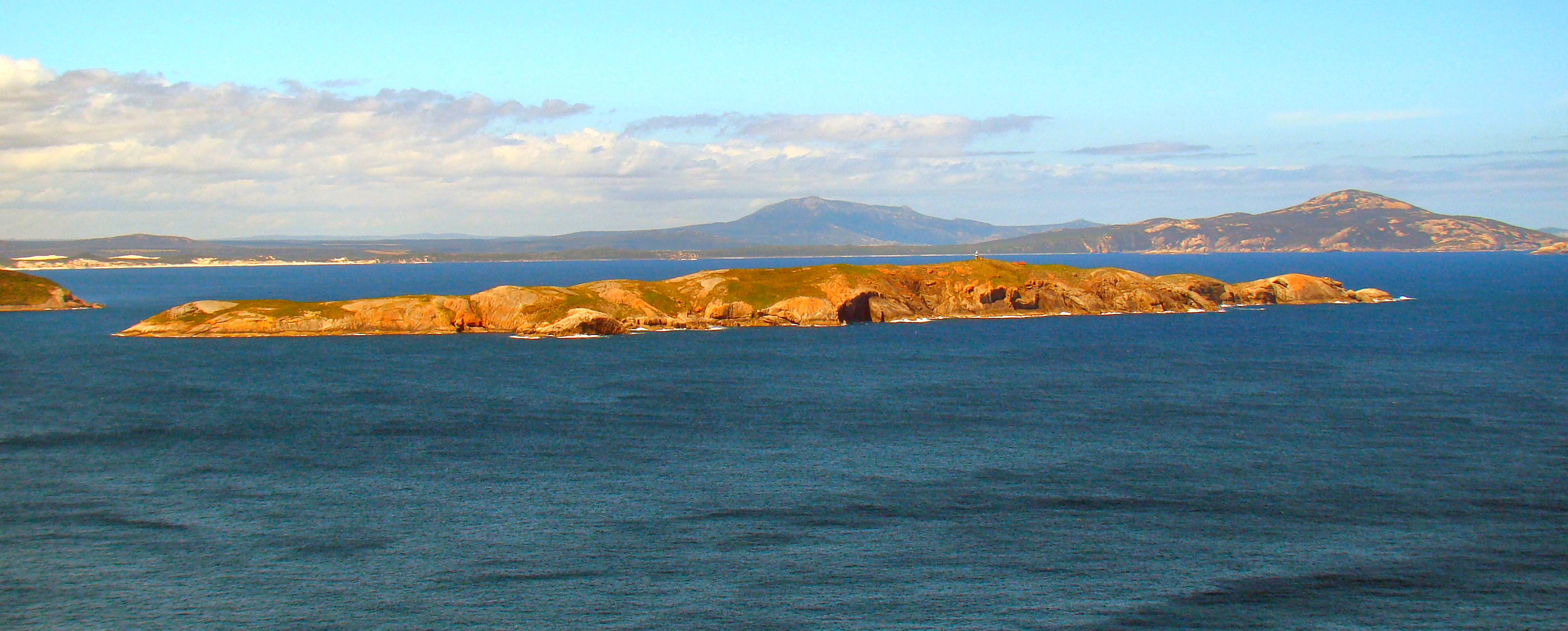
- Breaksea Island from the Flinders Peninsula to the south-west, near Albany

Geography
- Coordinates: 35°03′50.34″S 118°03′42.03″E

Administration
- Australia

Breaksea Island in King George Sound in the Great Southern region of Western Australia is 12 kilometres (7 mi) south-east of Albany.

== Description ==
The island was declared a nature reserve in 1969) managed by the Department of Environment and Conservation; its reserve number is 27614. The island is also registered as a national estate. The island is 103 hectares (250 acres) in area, 3 kilometres (1.9 mi) in length, and 600 metres (2,000 ft) at its widest part. The closest island is Michaelmas Island, located 1.5 kilometres (0.93 mi) north of Breaksea Island.

== History ==
The island was named by George Vancouver during his expedition in 1791. While in the area he also took possession of the lands for England. He named the island after its beaten appearance and the protection it offered to the landward side from the south-westerly winds.

In early April 1827, the island was visited by Major Edmund Lockyer, who found that the island, which had been previously assumed to be bare rock, actually featured between eight and ten acres of soil. He also noted the presence of seals, little penguins, sooty petrels, quail and bronze-winged pigeons.

== Lighthouse ==
A lighthouse was built on the island in 1858 by English convicts using pre-made cast iron sheeting. This lighthouse was replaced in 1902 by a cylindrical granite tower which remains in generally good condition. However, a major refurbishment taking 21 weeks was undertaken in early 2020, under a contract from the Australian Maritime Safety Authority (AMSA).

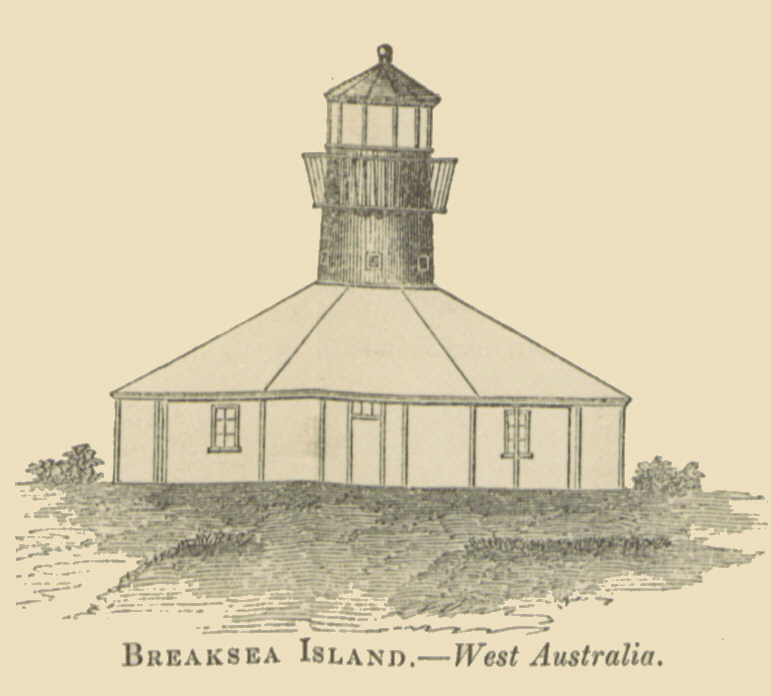
Breaksea Island Lighthouse (1860s)

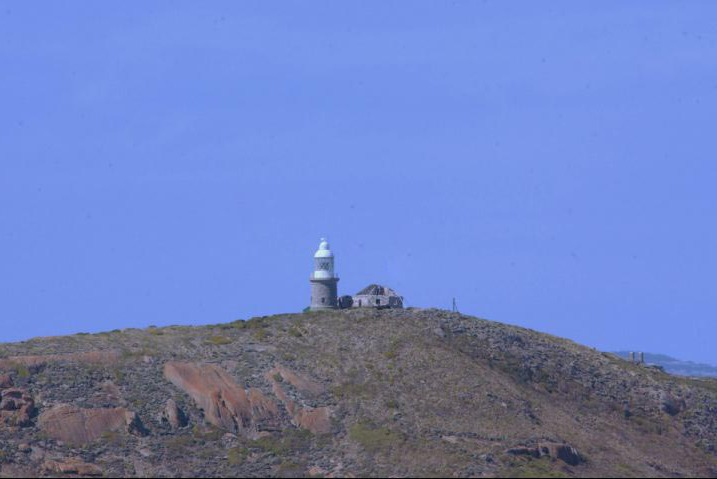
Breaksea Island Lighthouse
