= Esplanade Hotel, Albany =

Demolished hotel in Australia

Coordinates: 35°01′29.1″S 117°54′53.9″E

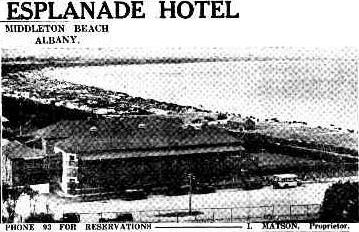
Esplanade Hotel 1938

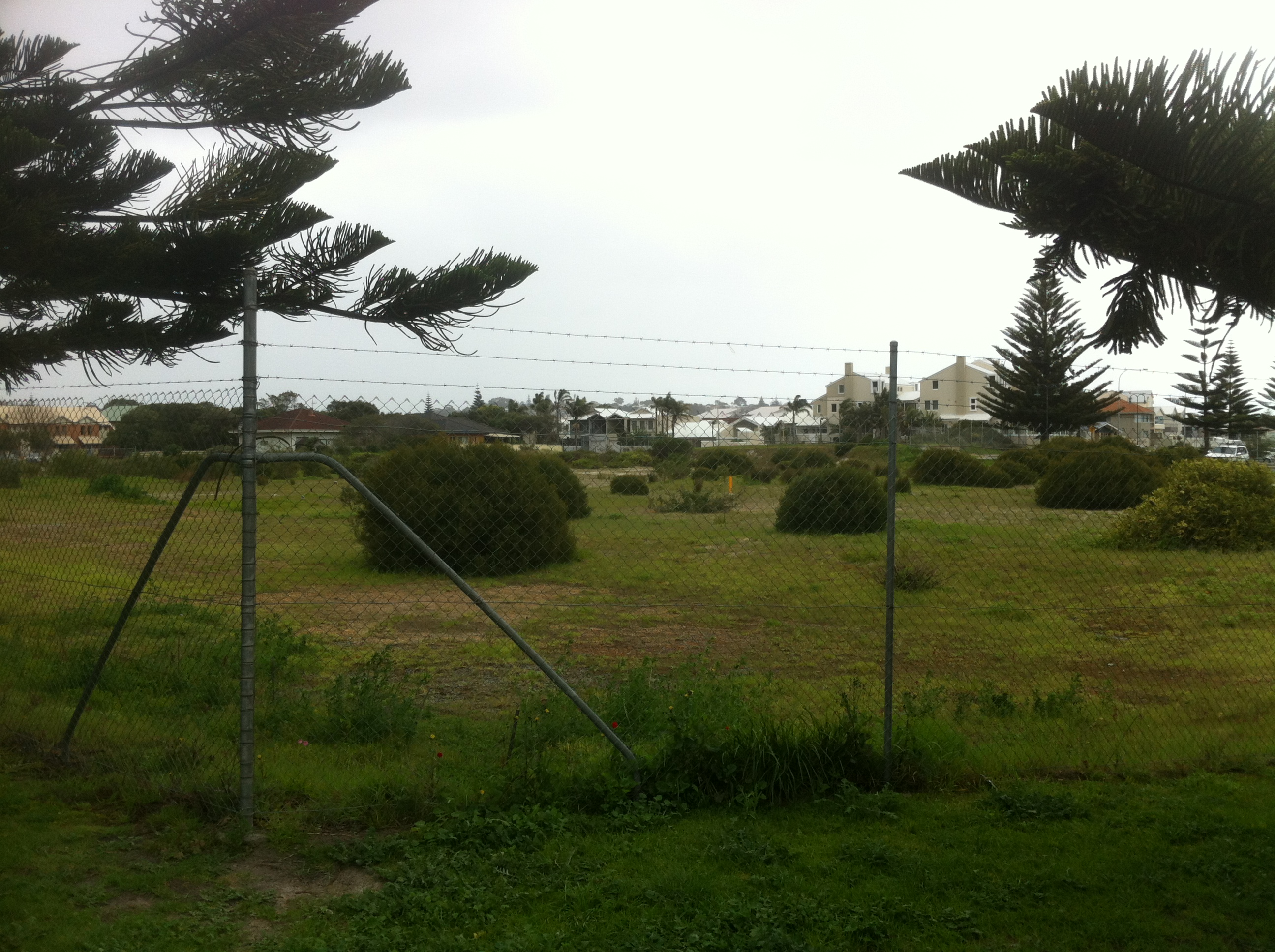
Esplanade Hotel site on Middleton Beach, Albany 2015

The Esplanade Hotel was a hotel that once stood overlooking Middleton Beach in Albany, Western Australia. The hotel was demolished in January 2007 by Singaporean owners, WCP Plaza, to make way for an 81-room hotel, function centre, village square, shops and health and recreation facilities. The proposal for the new hotel was approved in 2007 by the City of Albany. The council also supported the rezoning of several locations in Earl Street and Barry Court to allow the development of the hotel. The site remains vacant in 2015.

The original hotel was built on the site in 1898, with several different hotels being built in the same space over the years. In 1908 the hotel, insured for £2000, burned to the ground. An inquest into the cause of the fire was held, but no evidence could be found on how the fire originated. A new hotel was built and opened in April 1911, replete with modern conveniences such as septic tank, hot water, electric bells and telephones.

The last hotel to be built on the site was constructed by entrepreneur Paul Terry in 1991. Paul Terry was killed in a freak helicopter crash in Hawaii in 1993 and the hotel passed out of the family's management, and was eventually sold.

The building was demolished in 2007 to build the new hotel, village square, health and recreation facilities, and function centres. Tasmania-based architect, Morris Nunn, and planning consultant, David Caddy, were hired to develop the hotel with an international hotel operator. However, financial problems resulting from the 2008 financial crisis followed and the project was delayed. In 2008, Albany Mayor Milton Evans announced that plans to develop the hotel had not changed. In 2010, the entity placed the 13,171 square metres (15,752 sq yd) site on the market for A$15 million.

Local dissatisfaction at the lack of action at the site and the unattractiveness of the area lead to a yarn bombing, with a large hand made sign being stitched onto the perimeter fence; the sign was removed after three days. A necktie protest followed which was also quickly taken down, protesters then held a sock protest at the vacant site in 2010, hanging thousands of socks along the fence of the vacant site. The socks were later removed at the request of the real estate agent to give the land a greater chance of being sold.

The Premier, Colin Barnett, threatened to take back ownership of the land in 2013 after it had been lying vacant for so long, contributing to a lack of accommodation in the city.

In 2014, the state government acquired the site for A$7 million, partially sponsored with a A$3.3 million grant from the Royalties for Regions program.

In December 2020 it was revealed Pacifica Developments and Ausglobal Group had agreed to buy the 3700sqm vacant site to build a $25-$30 million hotel to be operated by Seashells Hospitality Group.

== See also ==
- List of places on the State Register of Heritage Places in the City of Albany
