= Southern Ocean Surf Reef =

The Southern Ocean Surf Reef is an artificial surf reef located offshore of Middleton Beach, Western Australia in Albany, Western Australia. It was constructed to create a consistent, surfable wave close to the city centre, attracting both local surfers and visitors.

== Background ==
The reef was the culmination of decades of advocacy by local surfers and community groups seeking improved surf conditions at Middleton Beach, which historically produced unreliable and unsurfable waves for much of the year. Early feasibility studies were completed in the 2010s, and planning continued through the 2020s with support from government and local organisations.

== Design and construction ==
Construction of the Southern Ocean Surf Reef began in March 2025, with placement of granite rock on the seabed roughly 140 metres offshore from Middleton Beach to form a submerged reef structure.

The reef structure comprises layered granite rock designed to induce wave breaking favourable for surfing.

The project cost was approximately AUD $13 million, with significant funding from the Australian Government, the Western Australian State Government, the City of Albany, and community contributions. Heron Construction Limited was contracted to manage the build, which utilised specialised marine equipment and local quarried rock.

== Opening and impact ==
The Southern Ocean Surf Reef was officially opened in July 2025, with a community event marking its completion. The reef produces surfable conditions on a consistent basis, with the design intended to provide rides up to 100 metres under average swell conditions and surfable waves for a significant portion of the year.

Local surfers have reported that the new wave has transformed the surfing scene at Middleton Beach, offering a variety of breaks suitable for different skill levels and contributing to tourism and community engagement.

== See also ==
- Middleton Beach, Western Australia
- Artificial reef
