= Middleton Beach, Western Australia =

Suburb of the City of Albany, Western Australia

Middleton Beach Binalup (Nyungar)
- Suburb
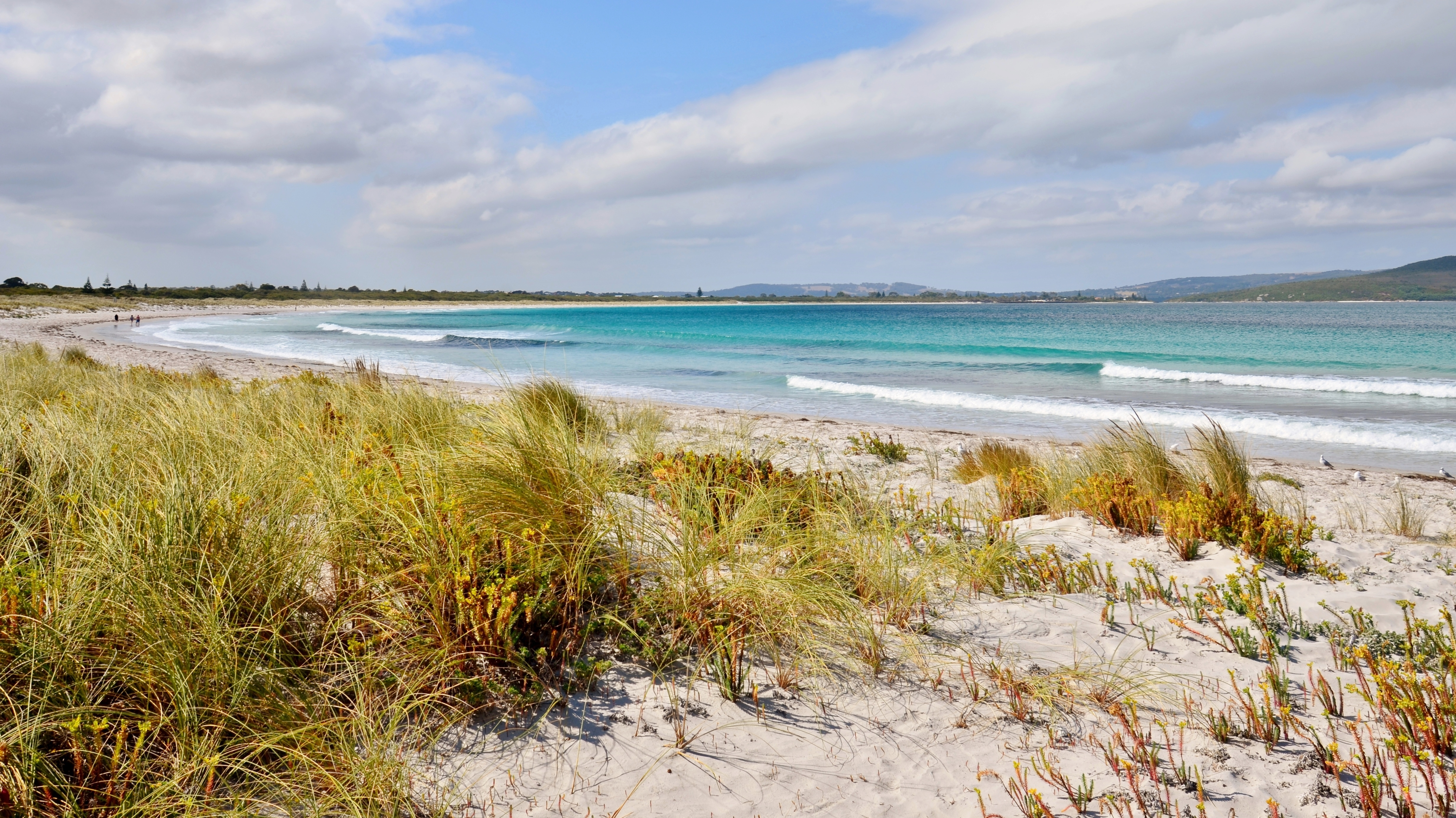
- Middleton Beach, 2018

- Interactive map of Middleton Beach
- Coordinates: 35°01′25″S 117°54′49″E
- Country: Australia
- State: Western Australia
- City: Albany
- LGA: City of Albany
- Location: 4 km (2.5 mi) from Albany

Government
  - State electorate: Albany
  - Federal division: O'Connor

Area
  - Total: 0.8 km^{2} (0.31 sq mi)

Population
  - Total: 759 (SAL 2021)
- Postcode: 6330
Suburbs around Middleton Beach
Spencer Park	Seppings	Collingwood Park
Mount Clarence	Middleton Beach	King George Sound
Mount Clarence	Mount Clarence	King George Sound

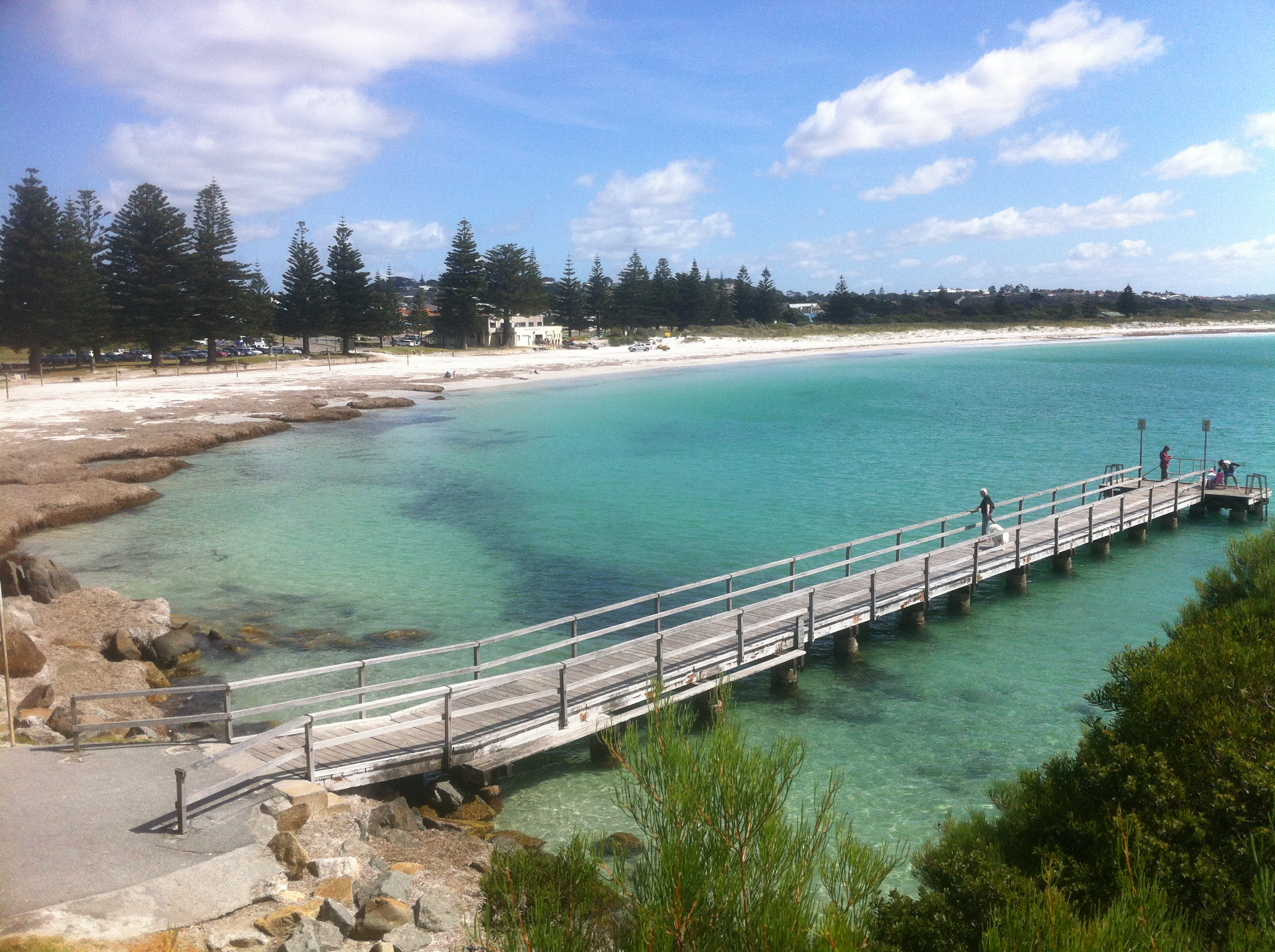
Ellen cove at the southern end of Binalup / Middleton Beach

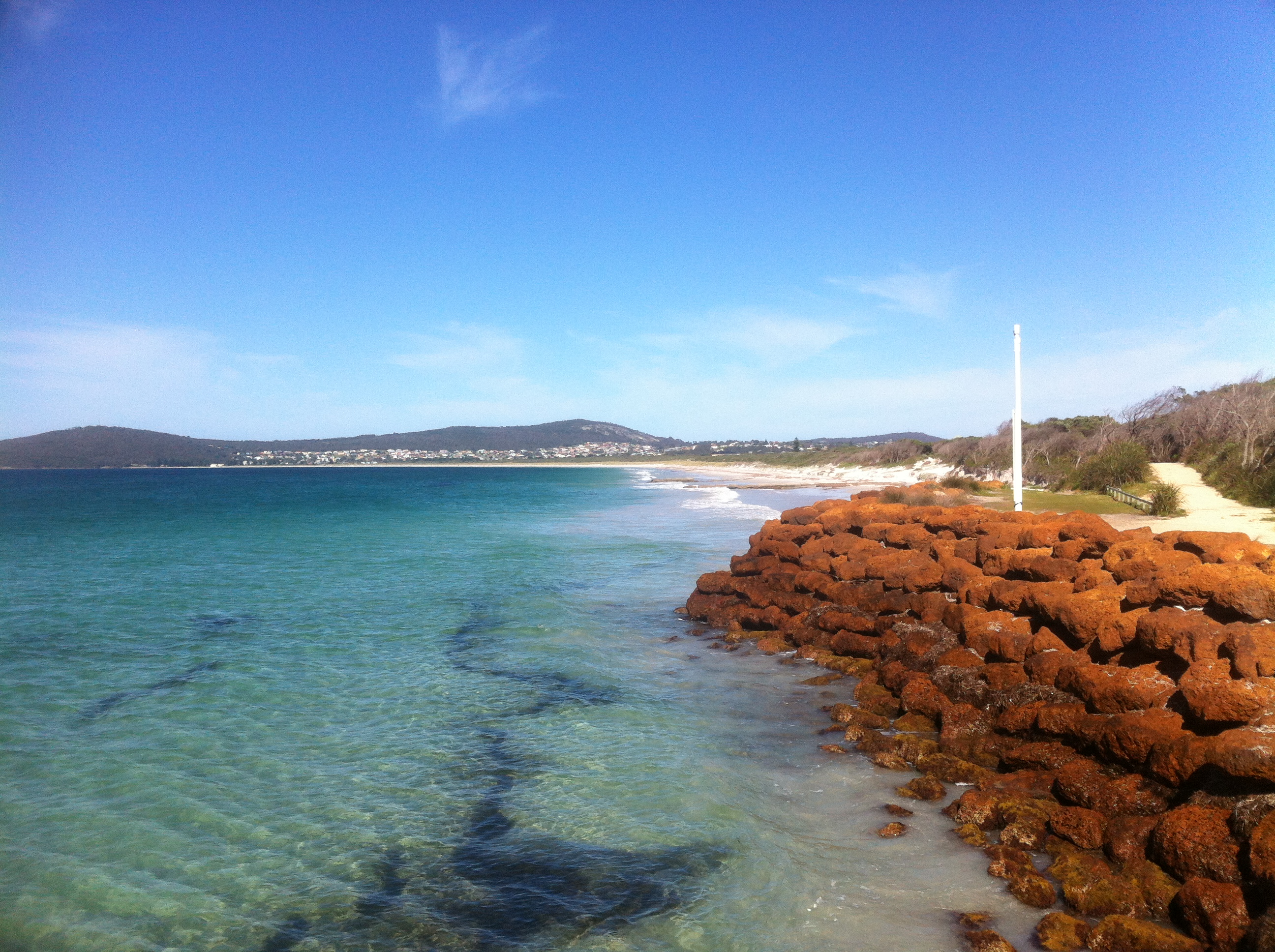
Binalup / Middleton Beach from Emu Point

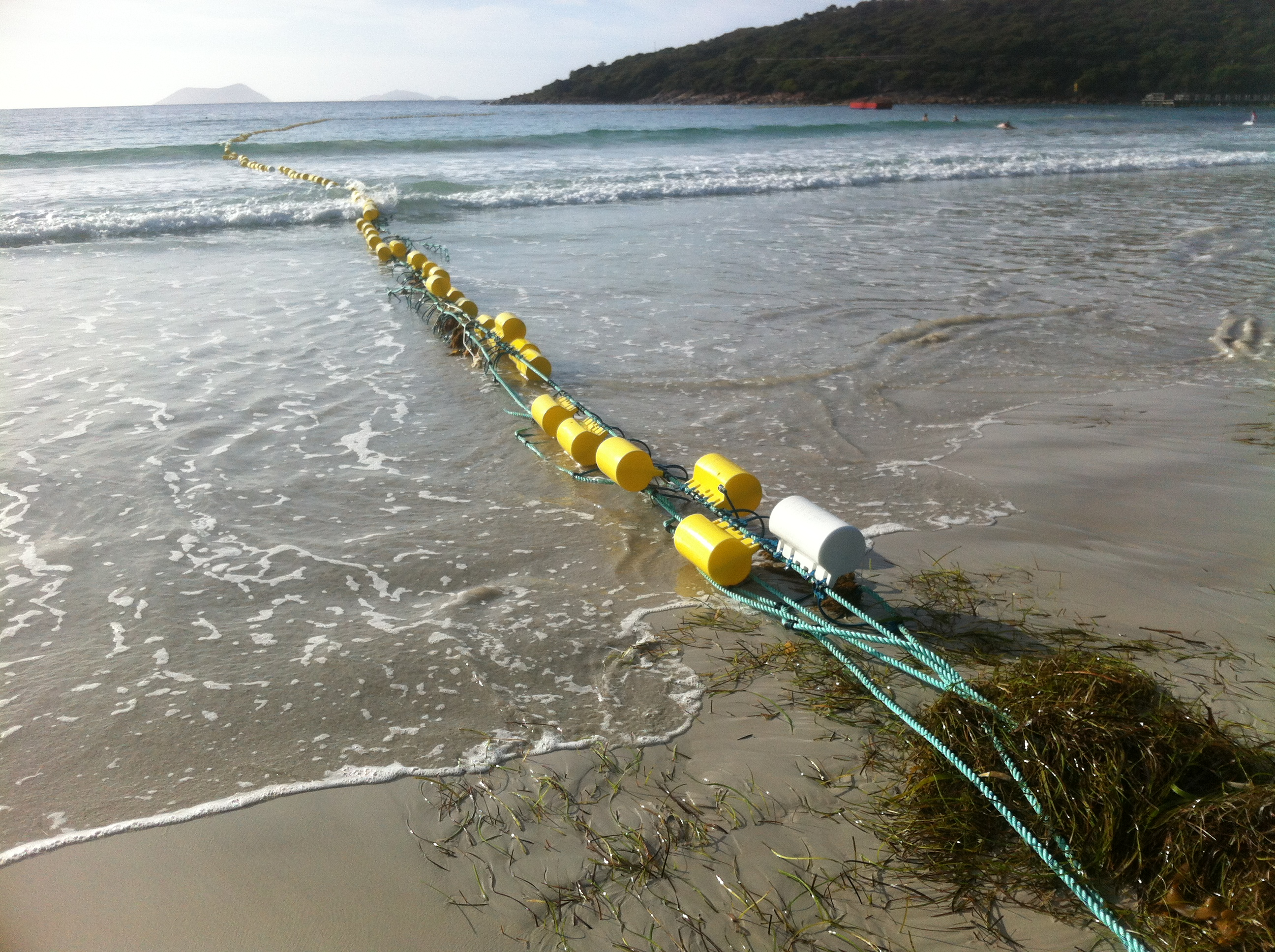
Binalup / Middleton Beach shark barrier floats and anchor point

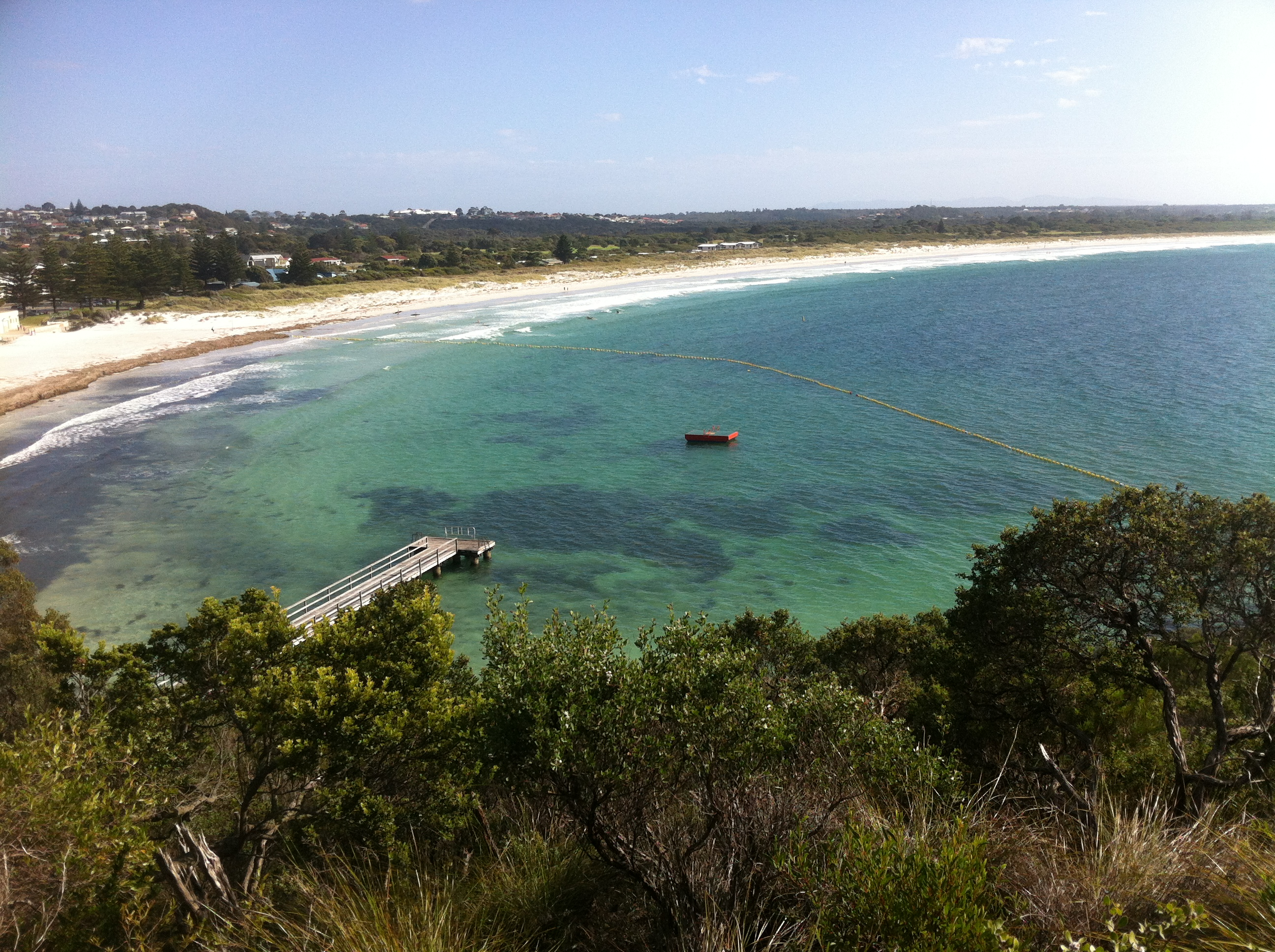
Albany Shark barrier, pontoon and jetty at Ellen Cove

Middleton Beach is a coastal suburb of Albany, Western Australia, located within the City of Albany approximately 4 kilometres (2.5 mi) east of the city centre. The traditional owners, the Noongar peoples, know the place as Binalup meaning the place of first light since the sun rises over the waters in the morning. The main road between the city and the locality is via Middleton Road. It is home to a caravan park and numerous holiday units which provide accommodation for visitors to the Albany region.

== Geography ==
Middleton Beach is bounded by Wollaston Road and the Albany Golf Course to the north, King George Sound to the east and Heritage Park to the west and south. The suburb has a population of 652. Southern Ocean Surf Reef is an artificial surf reef constructed with approximately 70,000 tonnes of granite located around 120 metres offshore from Middleton Beach.

== History ==
It was named after Captain Middleton in 1834, but was not officially gazetted as a suburb name until 1979. In the early years of Albany's settlement, Middleton Beach provided a handy spot to off-load supplies and stock onto shore as some of the larger boats could not navigate the entrance into Princess Royal Harbour (the main port).

The beach, dual named Binalup / Middleton Beach, is famous for its multiple Esplanade Hotels. In 1898, the first of the Esplanades opened, only to be burnt down in 1908. The rebuilt hotel was finished in 1911 and became more popular as a road was built connecting Albany town to Middleton beach, as before the only way to get there was by boat or bush track. In the 1940s it was to be demolished and rebuilt into a bigger hotel; it was finished in 1949 and became very popular. In the 1970s the old hotel was demolished and made way for a new hotel.

Then in 1990 it was demolished by Paul Terry, who had a dream to build a 5-star boutique, colonial-style hotel with bar and restaurant. It also had a separate building called the Extravaganza; it housed a few shops and a vintage car museum (the museum was later closed in 1993 due to Paul Terry's death and the collection was sold as too was the hotel). In 2006 plans were made to demolish the Esplanade and surrounding buildings for a new modern apartment hotel. The Extravaganza building and adjoining units were demolished in early December while the existing hotel was demolished in early 2007. The controversial move resulted in mass protest, and the site lies empty to this day. The Singaporean investors responsible put the hotel site back on the market in 2010. In November 2014, the site was sold to LandCorp for $7 million and will be developed at some time in 2016.

Plans to install shark barrier at the beach were passed by the Albany City Council in 2015. Installation of the A$400,000 Aquarius barrier structure was commenced and completed in March 2016.

The beach was dual named by the City of Albany and Landgate. The suburb name was not dual named.

== Attractions ==
Binalup / Middleton Beach is the main swimming beach for Albany and offers swimming and recreational beach activities. The waters are protected by King George Sound; the Southern Ocean's waves do not usually reach these sheltered waters. Great Southern Right Whales can occasionally be seen close to shore during their annual migration and birthing.

Binalup / Middleton Beach boasts a jetty at the southern end, called Ellen Cove, and in summer a pontoon (a floating structure that can support many people) is placed in the ocean for enjoyment of swimmers. There is a cafe, a cafe/deli, a restaurant, and a fish and chip shop all within walking distance of the beach. The Ellen Cove Boardwalk climbs the hill to the south above Ellen Cove Jetty, with views over the King George Sound and Middleton Bay.

There is also accommodation ranging from a caravan park to motels and independent 'bed and breakfasts'.

Binalup / Middleton Beach also provides an easily accessible location for viewing Southern Right and Humpback whales during their annual migration to the Southern Ocean. Whales enter the bay to rest and can sometimes be seen as close as 20–30 metres from the shore or frolicking out in the deeper waters of the bay.

Just off Binalup / Middleton Beach was the location of the ANZAC Memorial Re-enactment in 2014 when battleships from around the world displayed their remembrance of the ANZAC troops who left for Gallipoli in 1914.

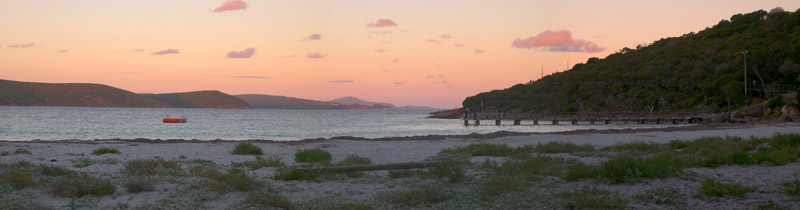
Binalup / Middleton Beach at sunset
