= Middleton Beach shark barrier =

Shark barrier in Albany, Western Australia

Coordinates: 35.025°S 117.918°E

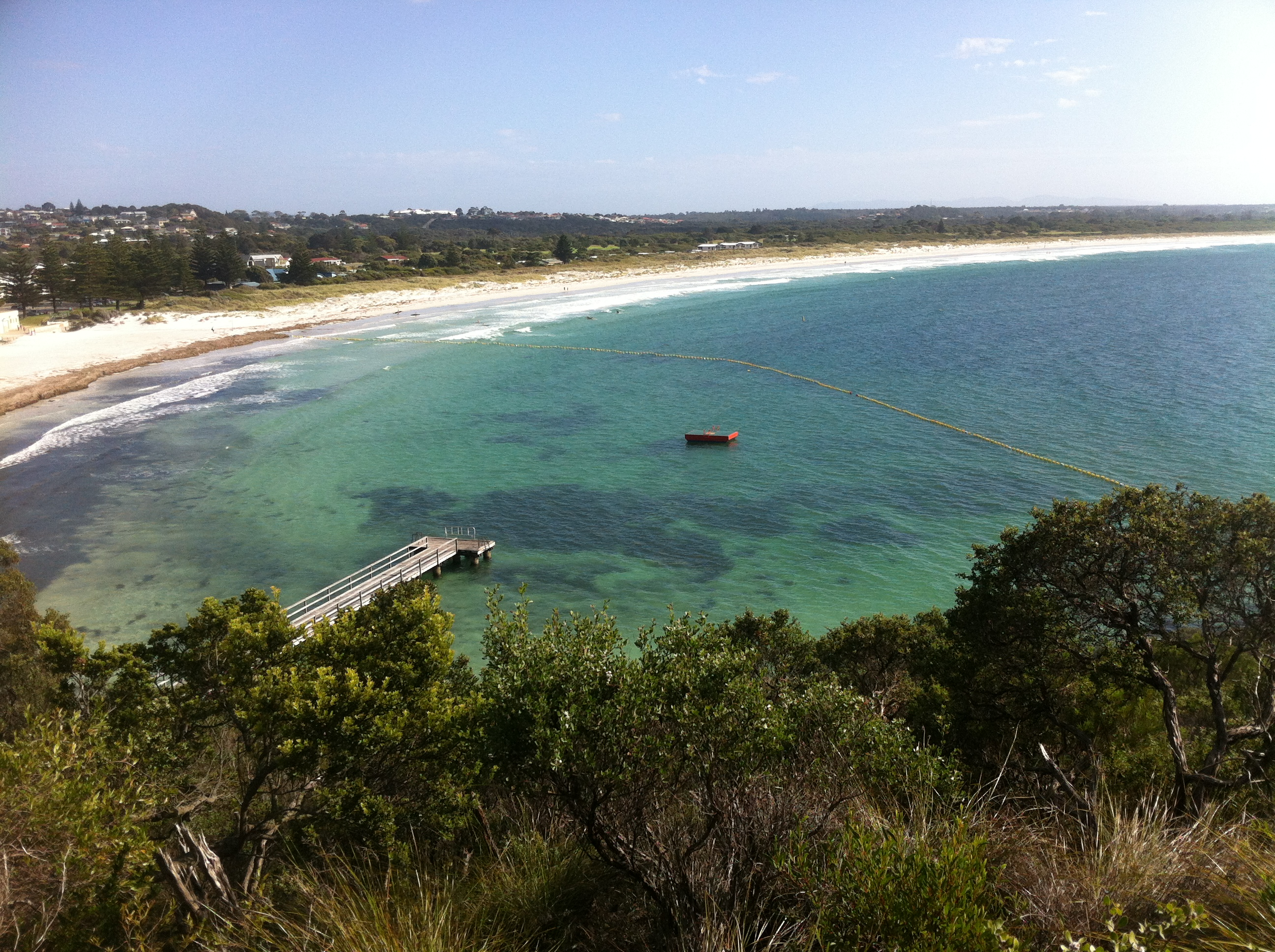
Yellow floats of Middleton Beach shark barrier March 2016

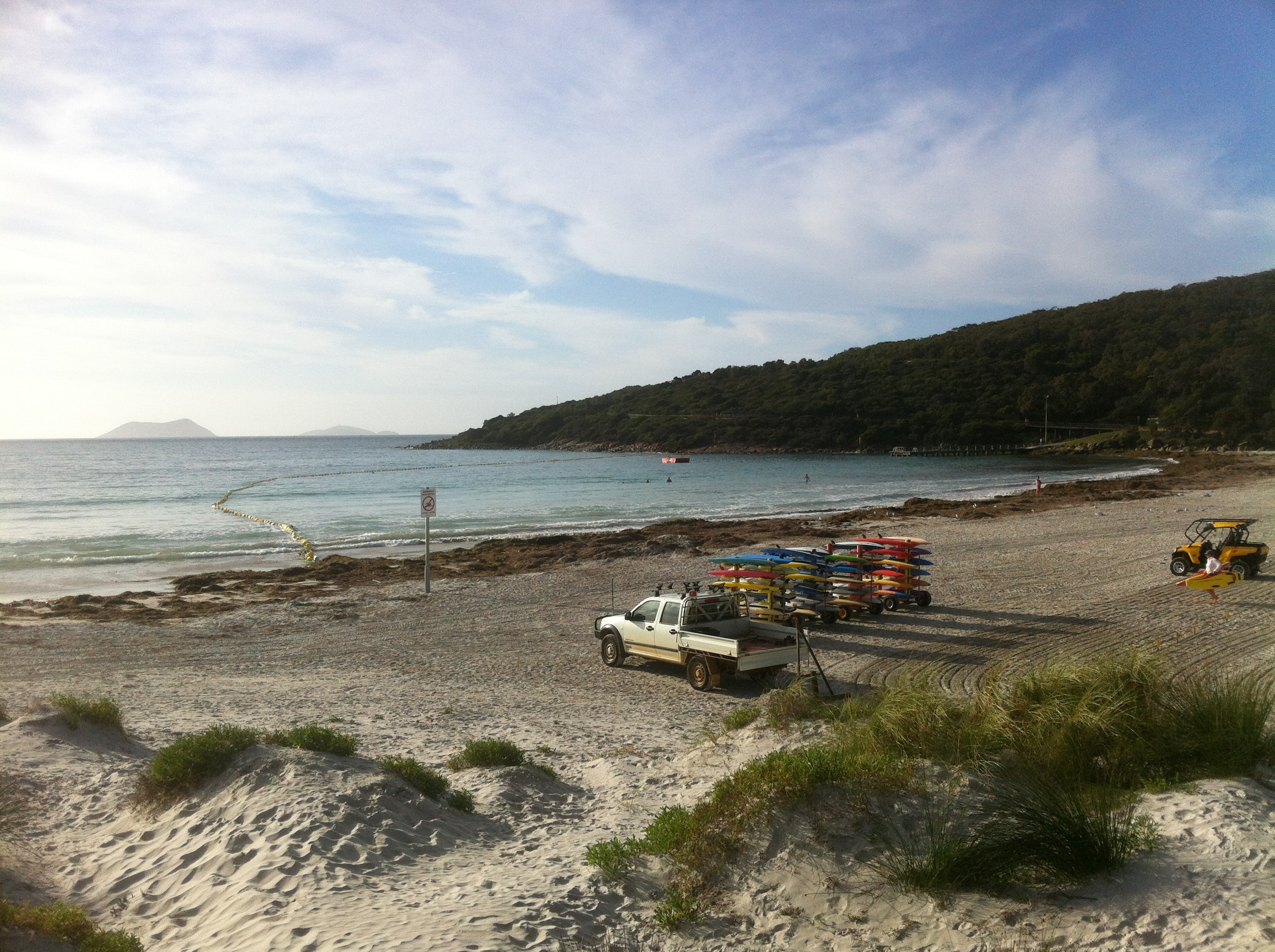
Ellen Cove from Albany Surf Life Saving Club

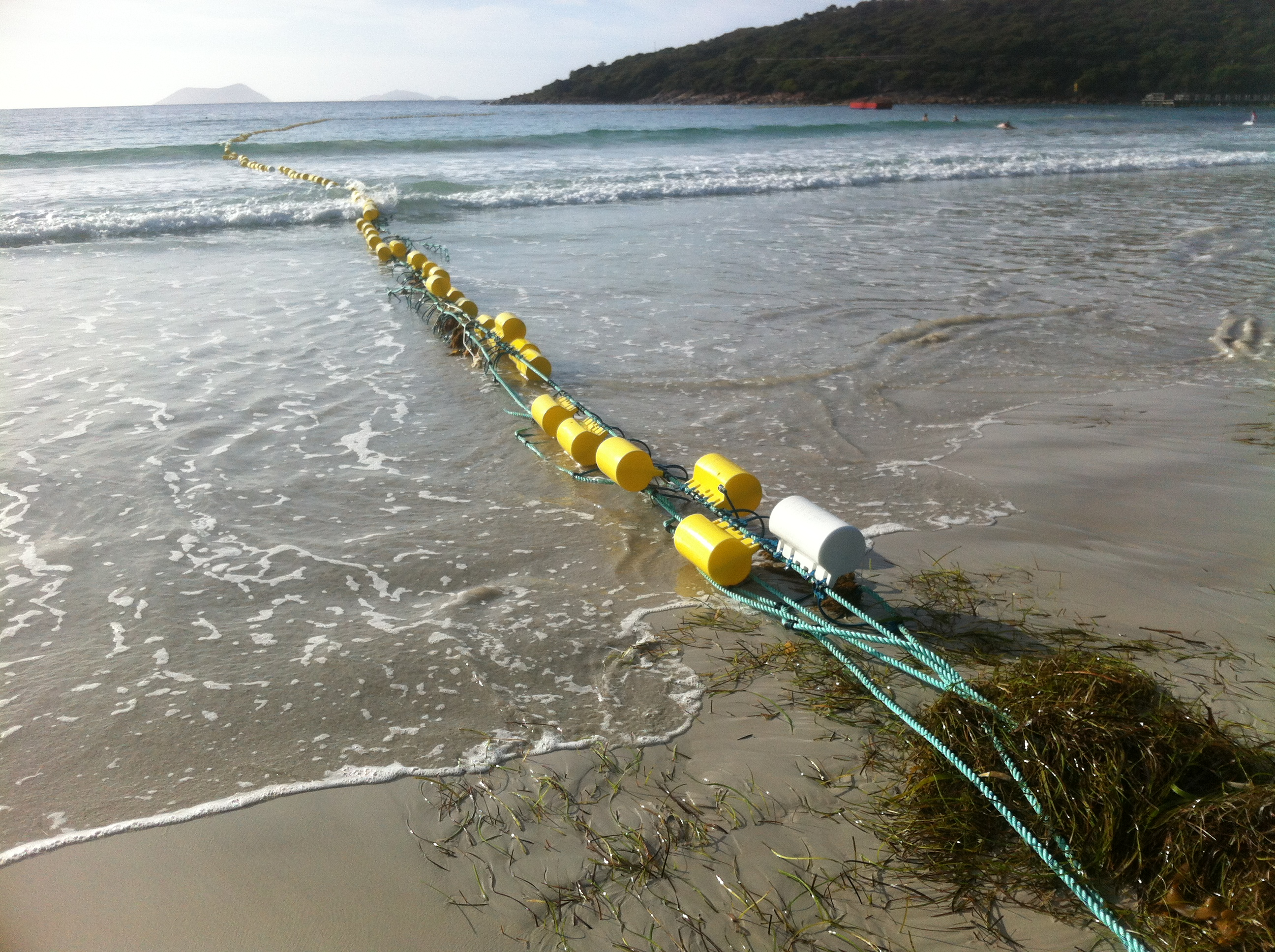
Middleton Beach shark barrier floats and anchor point

Middleton Beach shark barrier, also referred to as the Albany shark barrier and the Ellen Cove shark barrier, is a shark barrier to prevent sharks entering the main swimming area at Ellen Cove at the southern end of Middleton Beach, a popular swimming beach in Albany in the Great Southern region of Western Australia.

== Background ==
There has never been a fatal shark attack at Middleton Beach but the beach is closed several times a year as a result of shark sightings. In 2008 Jason Cull was attacked by a 4-metre (13 ft) great white shark just offshore from the beach. The shark bit his left leg; Cull fought it off and was rescued shortly afterward.

The Premier of Western Australia, Colin Barnett, introduced a shark drum-line baiting program in 2014 following seven fatal shark attacks in WA in three years. The program was heavily criticized and scrapped later the same year. Groups such as Sea Shepherd had called for eco-shark barriers and spotters as used in Cape Town in South Africa.

In July 2015 Barnett announced that two beaches would receive funding to install barriers: Middleton Beach, and the Perth metropolitan Sorrento Beach.

== Cost ==
The contract was awarded to an Australian company, Global Marine Enclosures, in December 2015 by the Albany City Council. The cost of the barrier was A$340,000, with the Government of Western Australia committing A$200,000 and the City of Albany contributing A$140,000 and A$30,000 per annum for maintenance.

== Installation ==
The Aquarius barrier system used at Middleton Beach is composed of heavy duty marine ropes with a nylon plastic strut design. The vertical struts are made from solid nylon plastic that is sufficiently rigid that marine life can't become caught in it; small creatures pass through it, larger ones are blocked without being trapped. The horizontal ropes give the structure strength in the water. The barrier has a 7,300-kilogram (16,000 lb) horizontal breaking strength and has an expected lifespan of around 10 years.

Installation of the barrier structure was commenced and completed in March 2016. The installation was delayed for a short time when sharks attacked pygmy whales just metres from the beach. One 2.5-metre (8 ft) whale had to be put down after receiving severe injuries in the attack.

The barrier was slightly damaged following bad weather shortly after the installation was completed. A small tear was discovered after a storm surge of seaweed broke through a section at the shallow end of the barrier. The section was replaced, with the barrier being stabilized with mooring ropes attached to chains until the work was completed.

== See also ==
- Shark attack prevention
- List of fatal shark attacks in Australia
