= Albany, Western Australia =

Albany Kinjarling (Menang Noongar)
- City
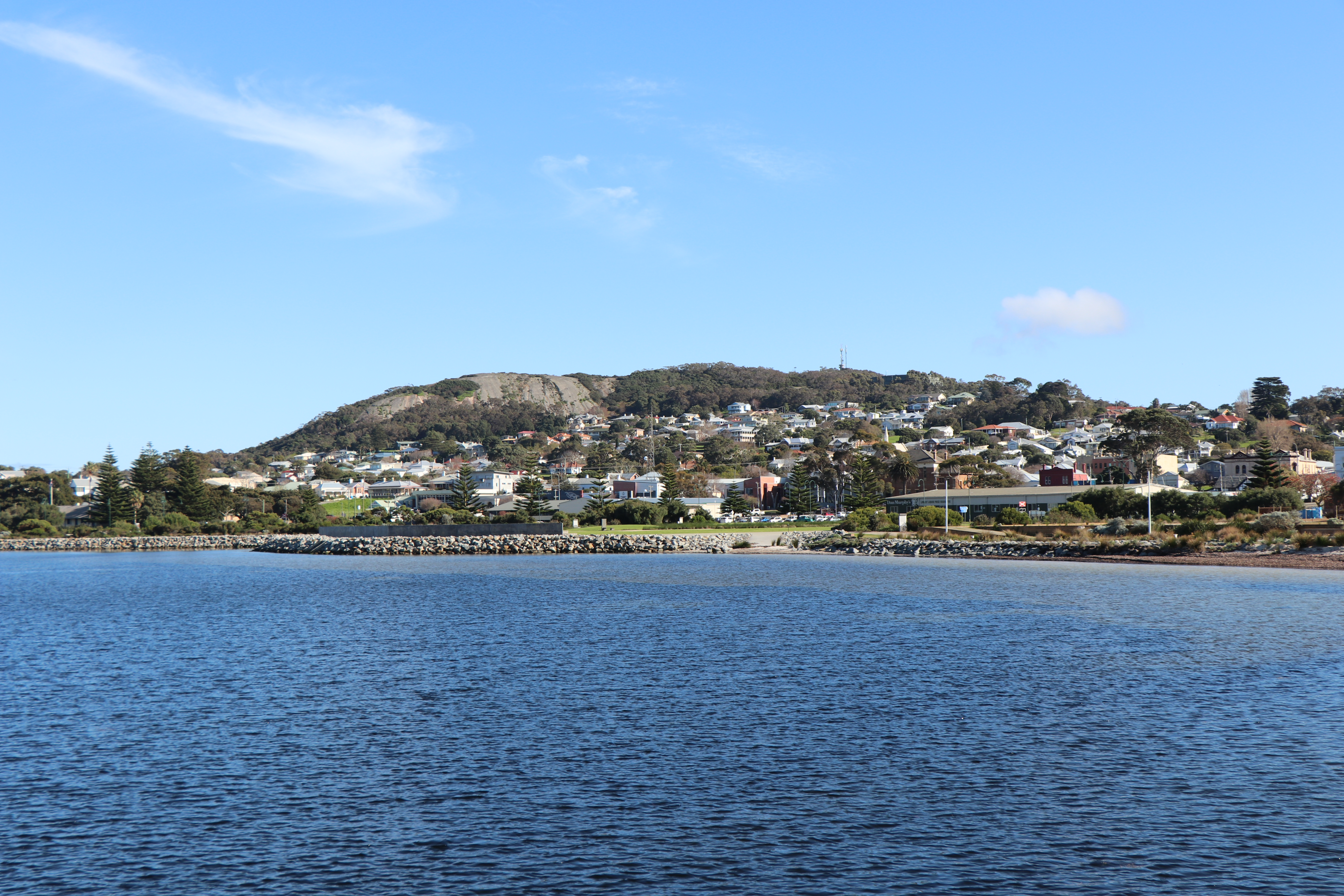
- Albany from the sea

- Coordinates: 35°01′22″S 117°52′53″E
- Country: Australia
- State: Western Australia
- LGA: City of Albany
- Location: 408 km (254 mi) from Perth; 482 km (300 mi) from Esperance; 330 km (210 mi) from Bunbury
- Established: 26 December 1826

Government
  - State electorate: Albany
  - Federal division: O'Connor

Area (2011 urban)
  - Total: 297.2 km^{2} (114.7 sq mi)
- Elevation: 26 m (85 ft)

Population
  - Total: 35,053 (2021) (44th)
  - Density: 117.944/km^{2} (305.47/sq mi)
- Time zone: UTC+08:00 (AWST)
- Postcode: 6330
- Mean max temp: 19.5 °C (67.1 °F)
- Mean min temp: 11.7 °C (53.1 °F)
- Annual rainfall: 929.6 mm (36.60 in)

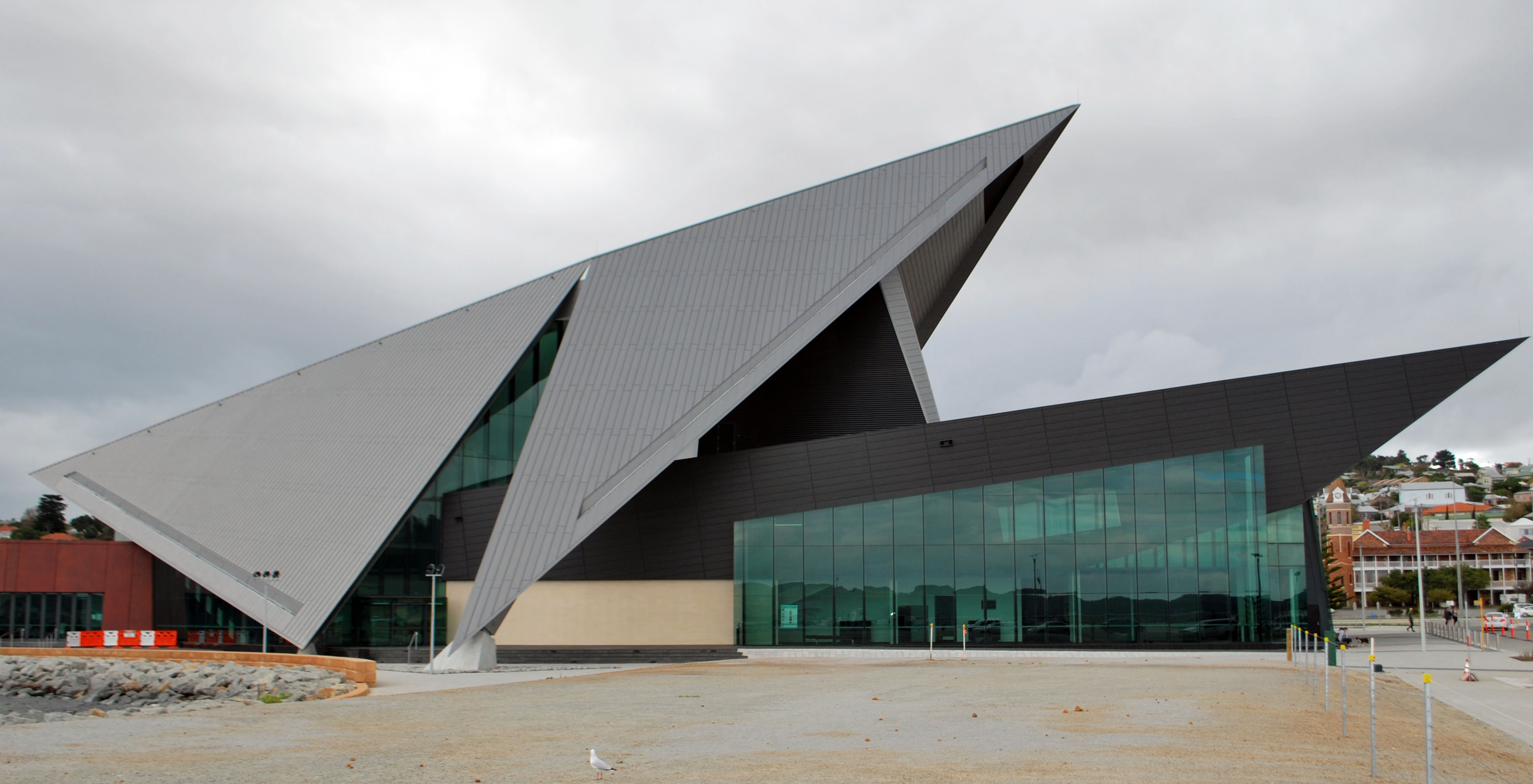
Albany Entertainment Centre, opened December 2010

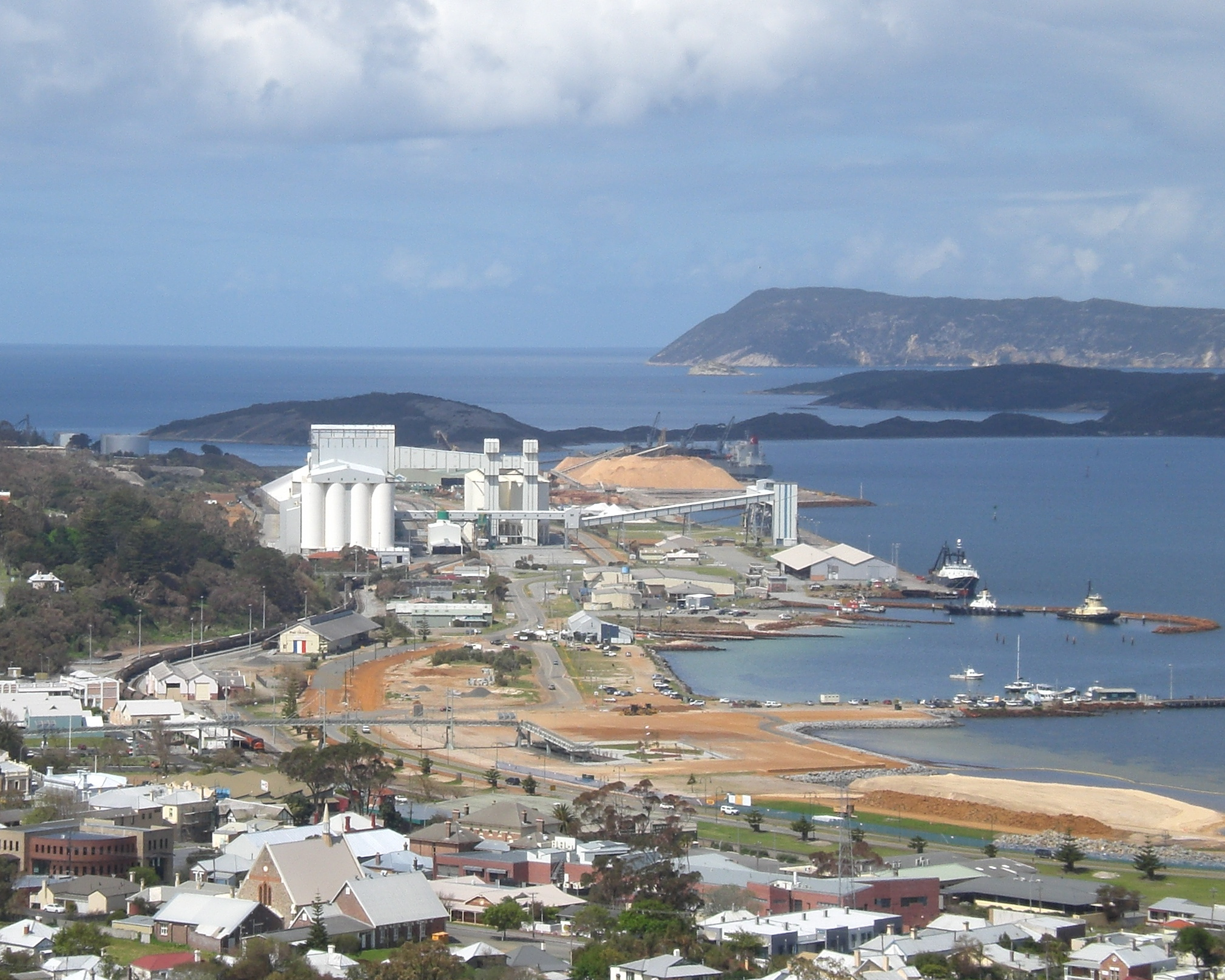
Port of Albany

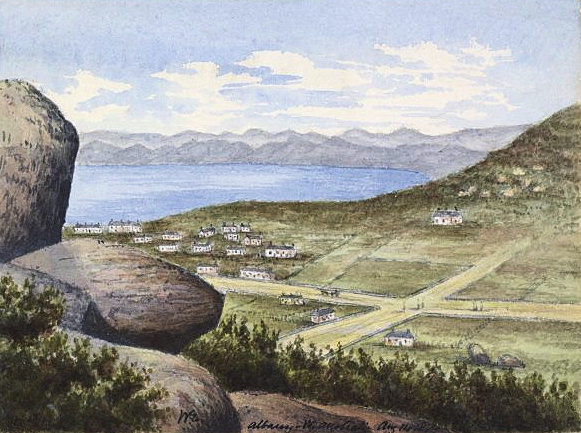
Albany, 1874 by Sir Whately Eliot

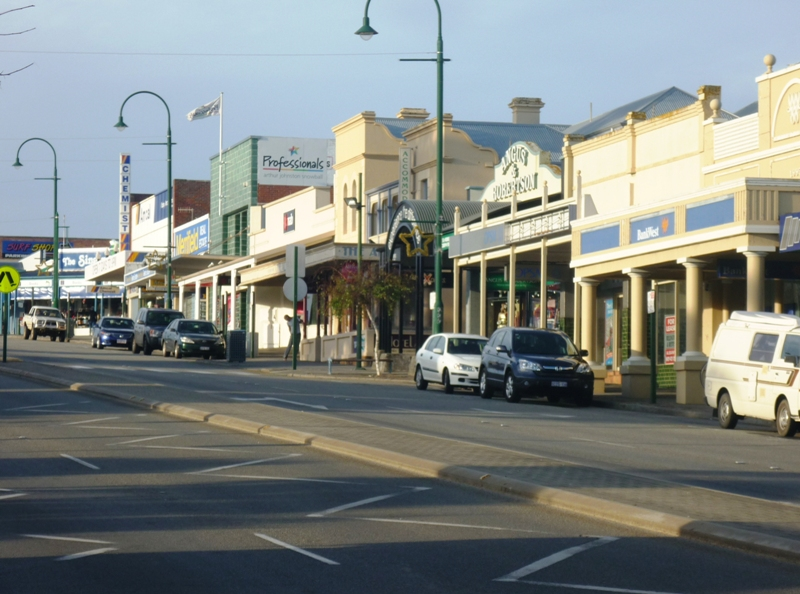
York Street in the centre of Albany

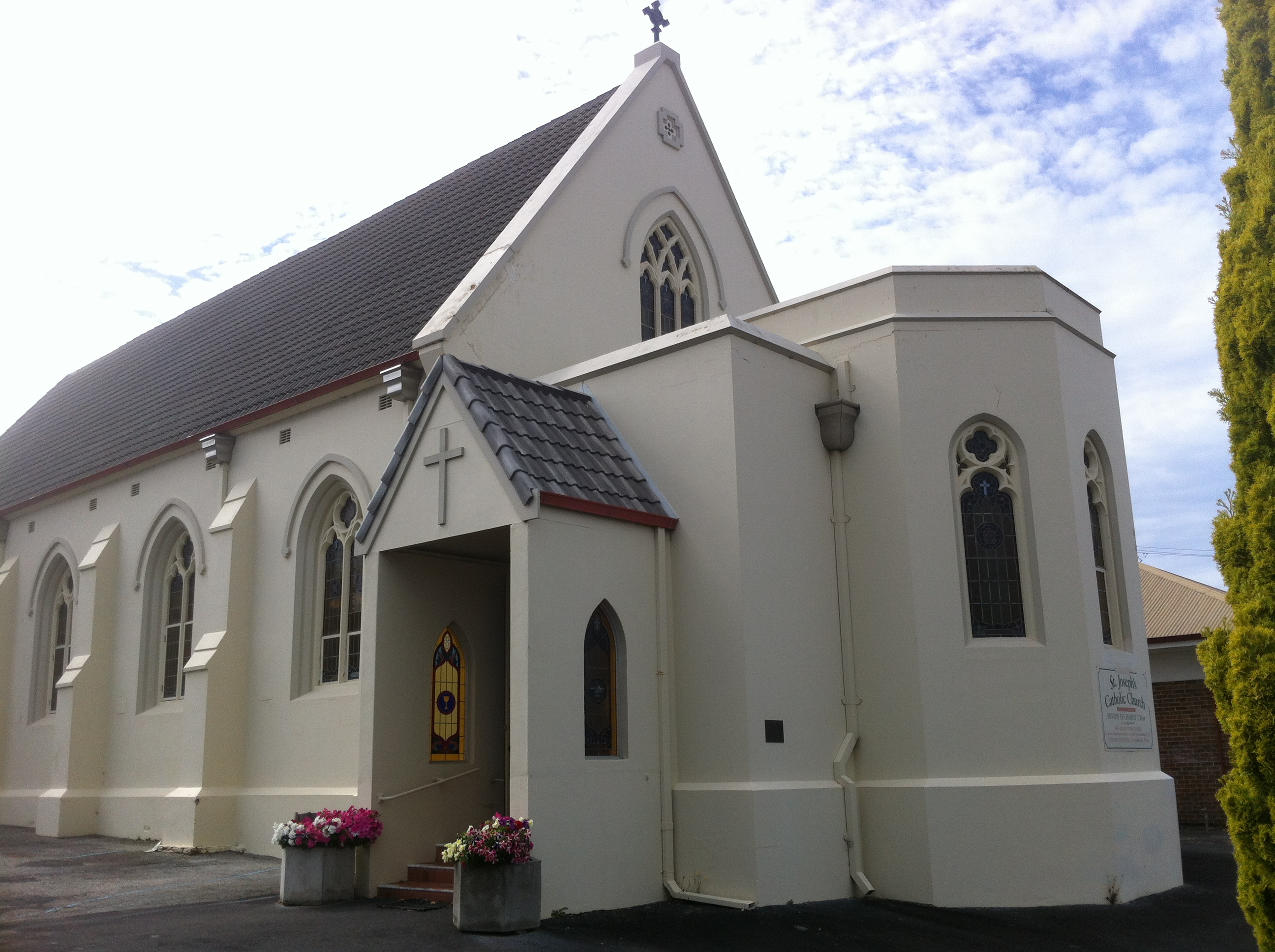
Saint Joseph Catholic Church in Albany

Albany (/ˈælbəni/ AL-bən-ee; (Note: According to British conventions of pronunciation, as applied in the cases, e.g., of Albury, New South Wales, and Albany, New York, the pronunciation of Albany, Western Australia, would be /ˈɔːlbəni/ (AWL-bən-ee). However, the local pronunciation is /ˈælbəni/ (AL-bən-ee).) Menang Noongar: Kinjarling) is a port city in the Great Southern region in the Australian state of Western Australia, 418 kilometres (260 mi) southeast of Perth, the state capital. The city centre is at the northern edge of Princess Royal Harbour, which is a part of King George Sound. The central business district is bounded by Mount Clarence to the east and Mount Melville to the west. The city is in the local government area of the City of Albany. While it was the first British colonial settlement in Western Australia (Note: The Wiebbe Hayes Stone Fort on West Wallabi Island is the oldest surviving European (but not British colonial) building in Australia. It was built by survivors of the Batavia shipwreck and massacre in 1629, predating Frederick Town by 197 years and indeed James Cook's first visit to Australia by 141 years. Frederick Town became Albany in 1831 upon becoming a part of the Swan River Colony.) – predating Perth and Fremantle by over two years – it was a semi-exclave of the Colony of New South Wales for over four years until it was made part of the Swan River Colony.

The settlement was founded on 26 December 1826 as a military outpost of New South Wales for the purpose of forestalling French ambitions in the region. To that end, on 21 January 1827, the commander of the outpost, Major Edmund Lockyer, formally took possession for the British Crown of the portion of New Holland not yet claimed by the Crown; that is, the portion west of the 129th meridian east, with the portion east already being claimed collectively by the Crown as New South Wales and Van Diemen's Land. During the last decade of the 19th century, the town served as a gateway to the Eastern Goldfields. For many years, it was the colony's only deep-water port, having a place of eminence on shipping services between Britain and its Australian colonies. The opening of the Fremantle Inner Harbour in 1897, however, saw its importance as a port decline, after which the town's industries turned primarily to agriculture, timber and later, whaling.

Contemporary Albany is the southern terminus for tourism in the region, and the state's south west, which is known for its natural environment and preservation of its heritage. The town has a role in the ANZAC legend, being the last port of call for troopships departing Australia in the First World War. On 1 November 2014, the Australian and New Zealand Prime Ministers opened the National Anzac Centre in Mount Clarence, Albany, to commemorate 100 years since the first ANZAC troops departed from King George Sound. Approximately 40,000 people attended the commemoration events held between 30 October and 2 November 2014.

An auxiliary submarine base for the US Navy's 7th Fleet was developed during the Second World War in the event the submarine base at Fremantle was lost. Also in the harbour was a Royal Australian Navy naval installation which provided for refuelling from four 5,100-tonne (5,000-long-ton) fuel tanks.

== Toponymy ==
Upon its establishment in 1826, the settlement was named Frederick Town in honour of Prince Frederick, Duke of York and Albany. In 1831, the settlement was transferred to the control of the Swan River Colony and renamed Albany by Lieutenant-Governor James Stirling.

The name of the area in the Noongar language of the local Menang people is Kinjarling, which has been said to mean "place of plenty" and "place of rain". In 2020, the City of Albany began, as part of an official dual-naming project, to give prominence to Kinjarling as the city's Aboriginal name.

== Early history ==
Kinjarling was home to Menang Noongar tribes during the summer season. Early British explorers recorded evidence of fish traps located on Emu Point and on the French, now the Kalgan, River. Vancouver made attempts to find the inhabitants of the area but only found bark dwellings that were unoccupied. Later explorers made contact and were told to leave, but were accepted when they did not. Most of the British exploration was undertaken to survey the land and sea to assess the profitability of resources. The explorers occasionally noted encounters with Noongars. Native treatment laws and programs have affected the tribes since settlement.

== Heritage buildings ==
There are a number of heritage buildings in Albany; see List of heritage places in the City of Albany and Category:Heritage places in Albany, Western Australia. These include:

- The Old Farm, Strawberry Hill was established in 1827 as a government farm to feed the colonial soldiers stationed around King George's Sound. It is the oldest farm in Western Australia. The homestead, which became the home of the Government Resident in 1833, is an example of a colonial gentleman's residence. After a chequered history, the property was vested in the National Trust WA in 1964 and is now a house museum.
- Patrick Taylor Cottage (1832), Western Australia's oldest surviving dwelling, built in 1832 by the Morley Brothers. It is now maintained by the Albany Historical Society.
- St John's Church (1841–1848) is a stone building with shingled roofs in the Old Colonial Gothick Picturesque style. Set among trees, it was designed to be part of an overall contrived picturesque scene in the manner of an English garden landscape.
- Scots Uniting Church (1892) was designed in the Victorian Academic Gothic style by Melbourne architect Evander McIver and built with local granite stonework.
- The complex now known as The Residency Museum was established in 1850 as a depot for the Convict Establishment in Albany. It is an L-shaped, single-storied, masonry building with a timber framed, timber shingled roof. In 1873 it was converted into the Resident Magistrate's home. It now serves as a museum.
- The Victorian Free Classical Revival style Town Hall (1888) is a two-storey stone building with a prominent clock tower, which dominates York Street, the main street of Albany. It has been put to many uses apart from council meetings, including public entertainment and public meetings of all kinds and even as the venue for the first regional meeting of the State Parliament.
- The Old Post Office was built in two stages, the first was designed in 1869 by J Manning, the second, including a prominent tower, was designed in 1896 by George Temple-Poole. It now houses the Albany campus of the University of Western Australia.
- The Court House, constructed of Albany brick and granite with a tiled roof, was designed in the Federation Romanesque style by the Public Works Department under the supervision of George Temple-Poole and Hillson Beasley in 1897.
- Another example of the work of George Temple Poole is the limestone and shingle Federation Arts and Crafts style Cottage Hospital, designed in 1886 and completed in 1897. It is one of the oldest hospitals in the state and served as such until 1962. It is now occupied by the Vancouver Arts Centre (named after the explorer George Vancouver).
Images of heritage buildings
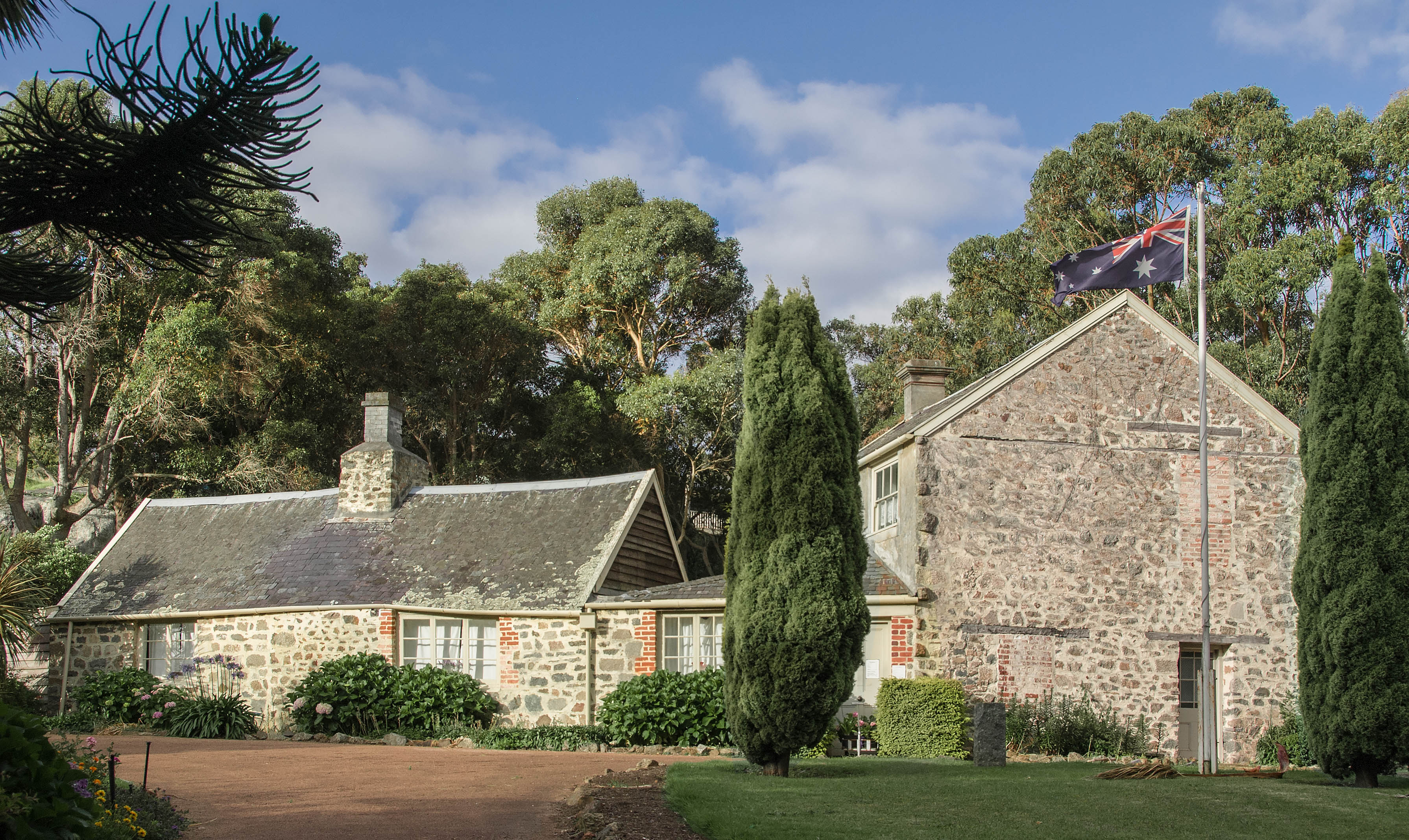
Old Farm, Strawberry Hill

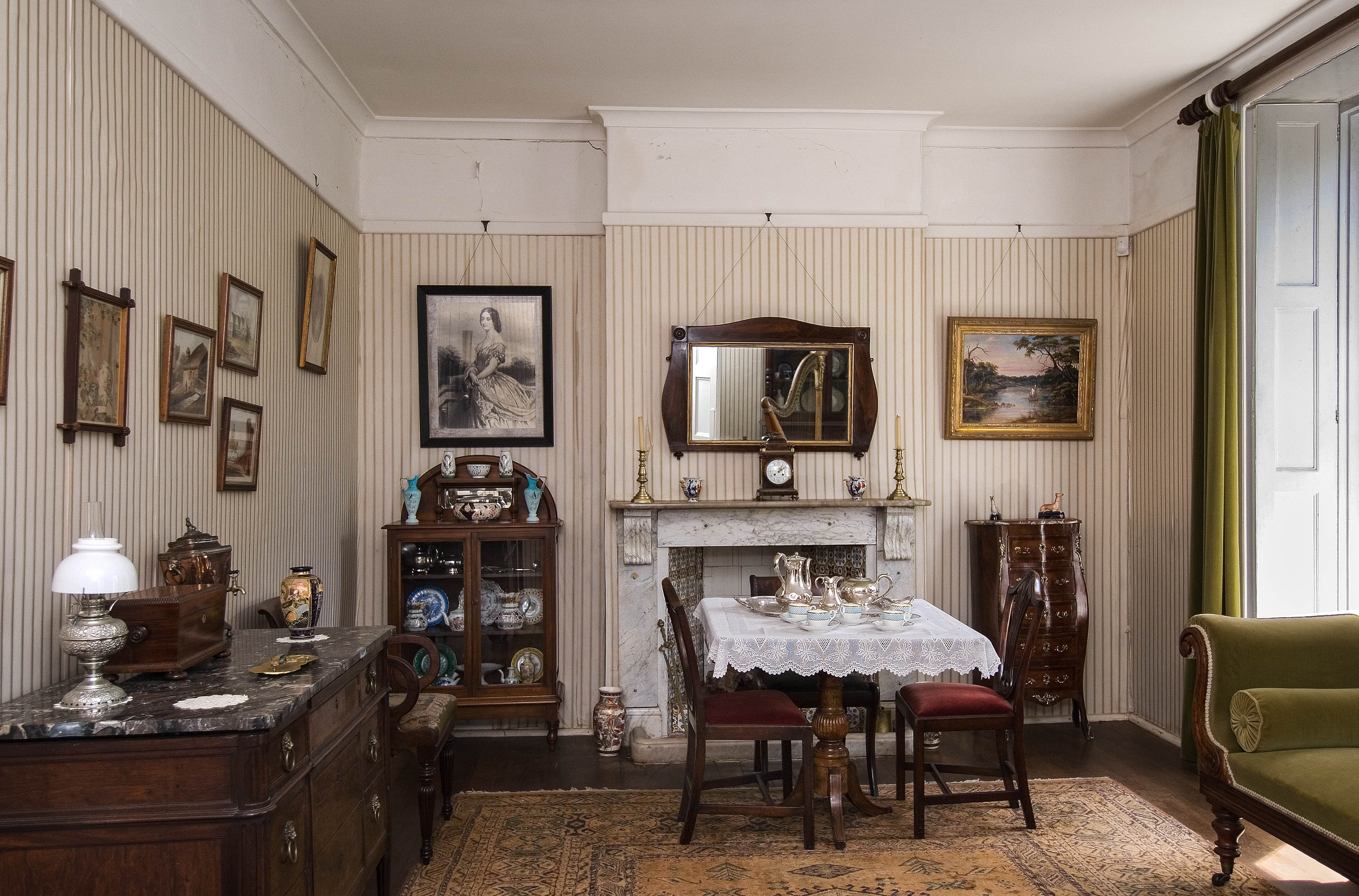
Old Farm, drawing room

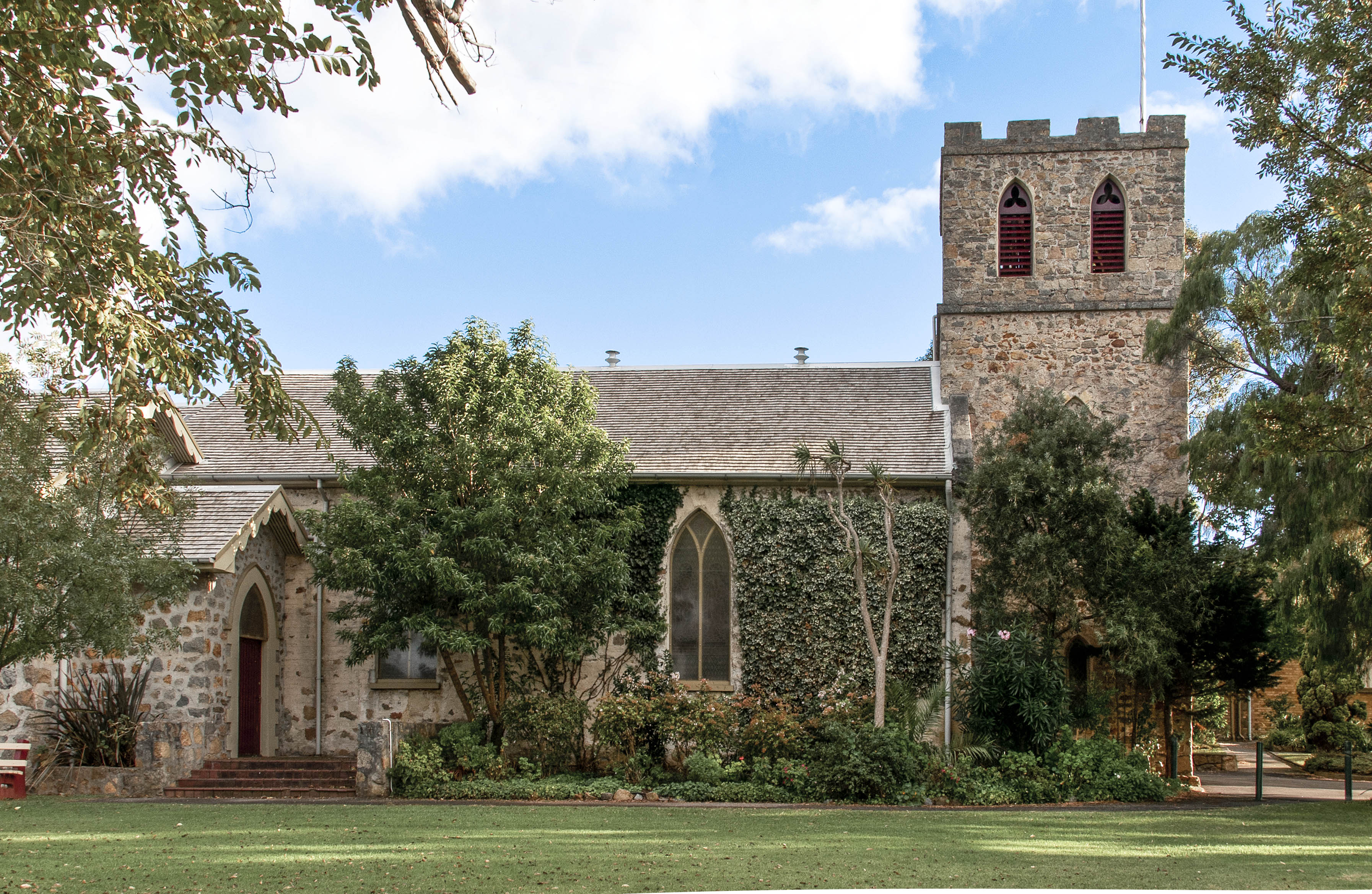
St. John's Church

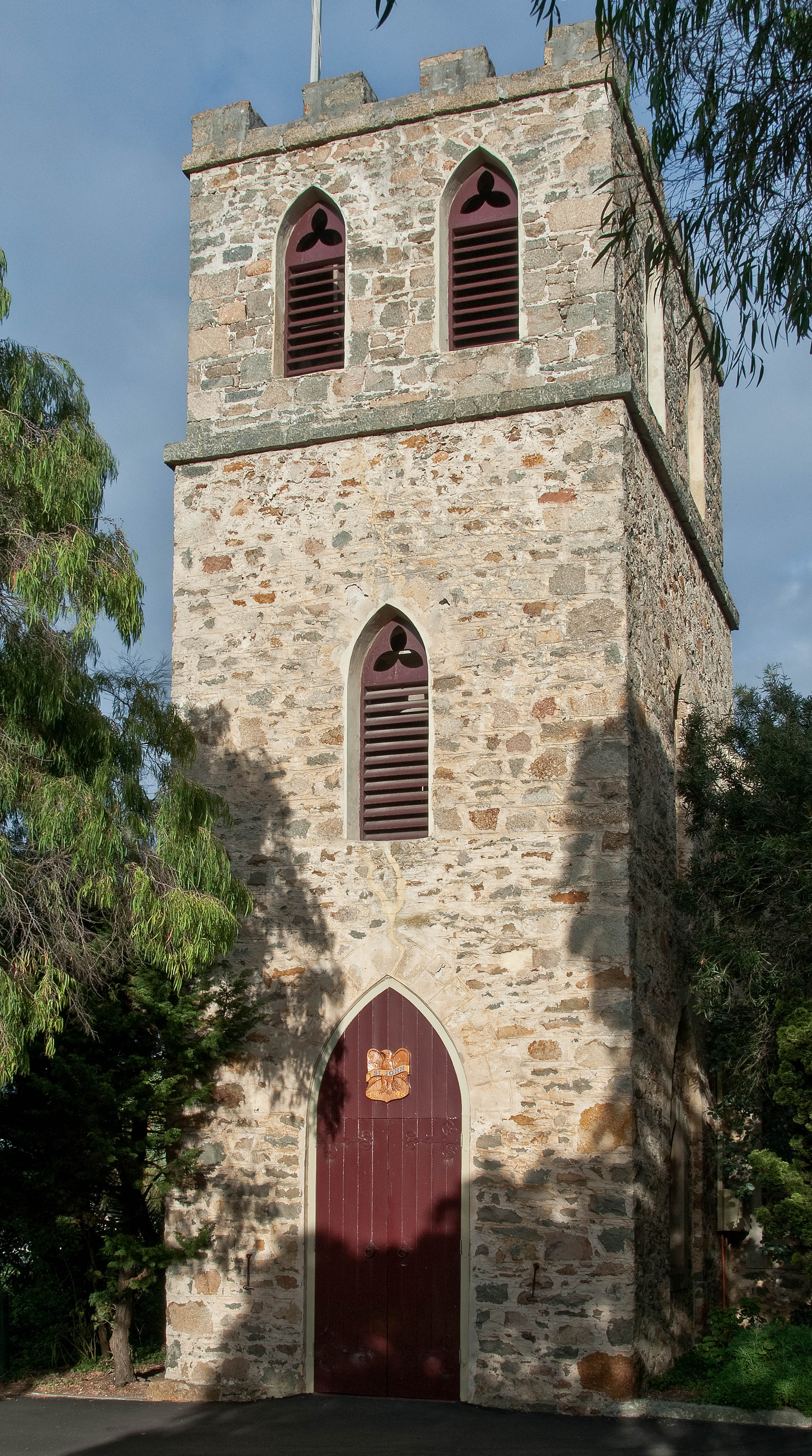
St.John's Church tower

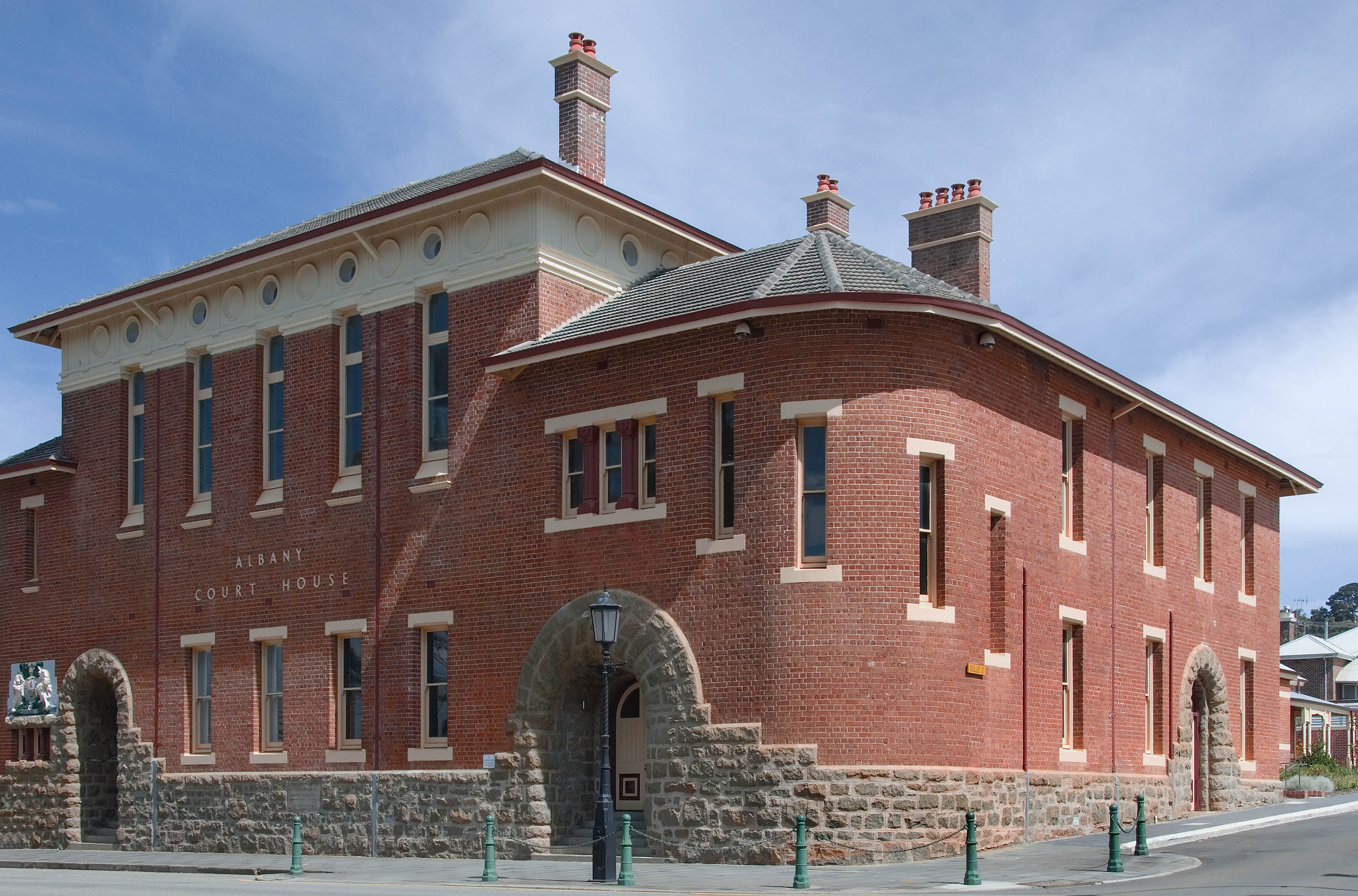
Albany Courthouse

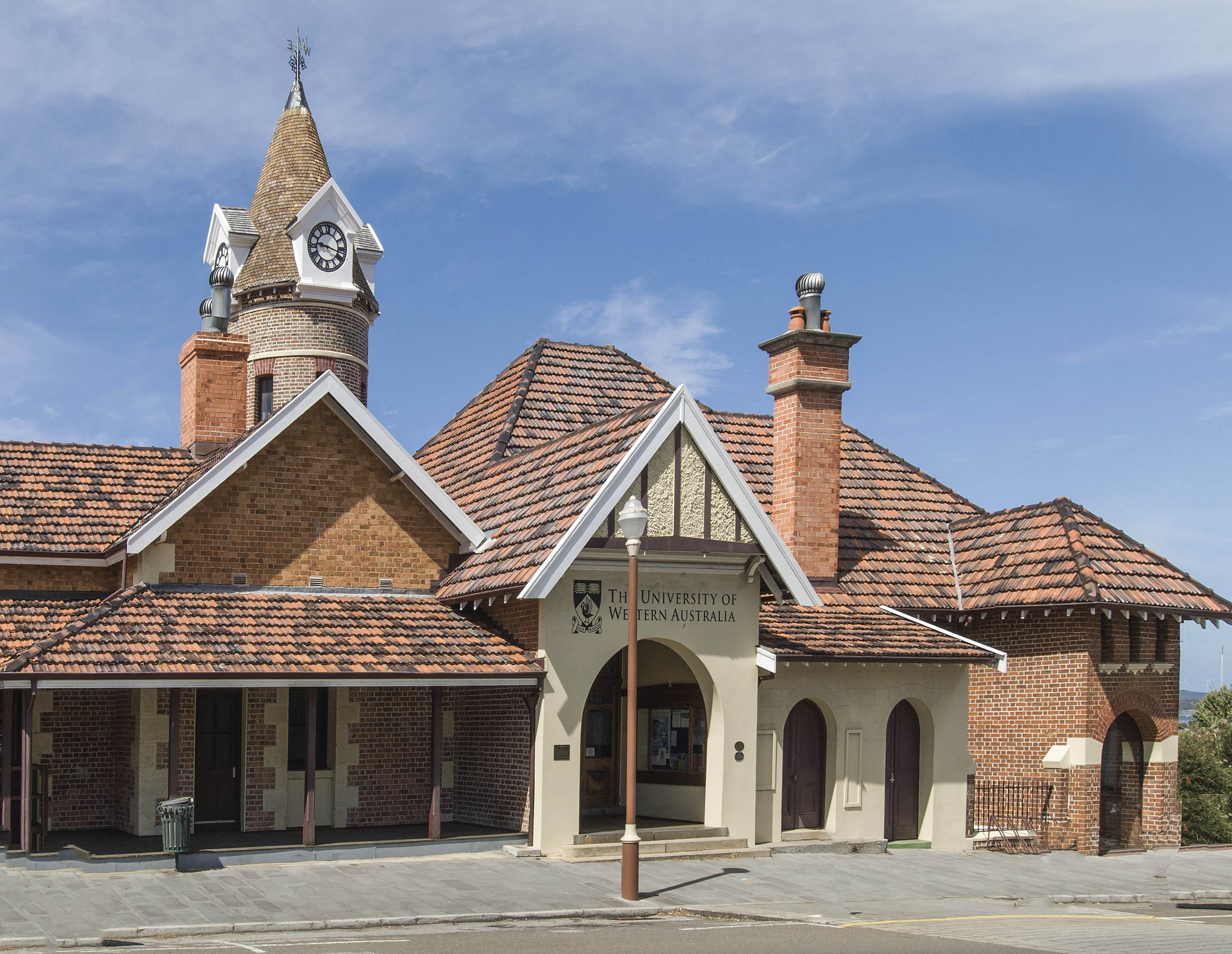
Old Post Office, north front

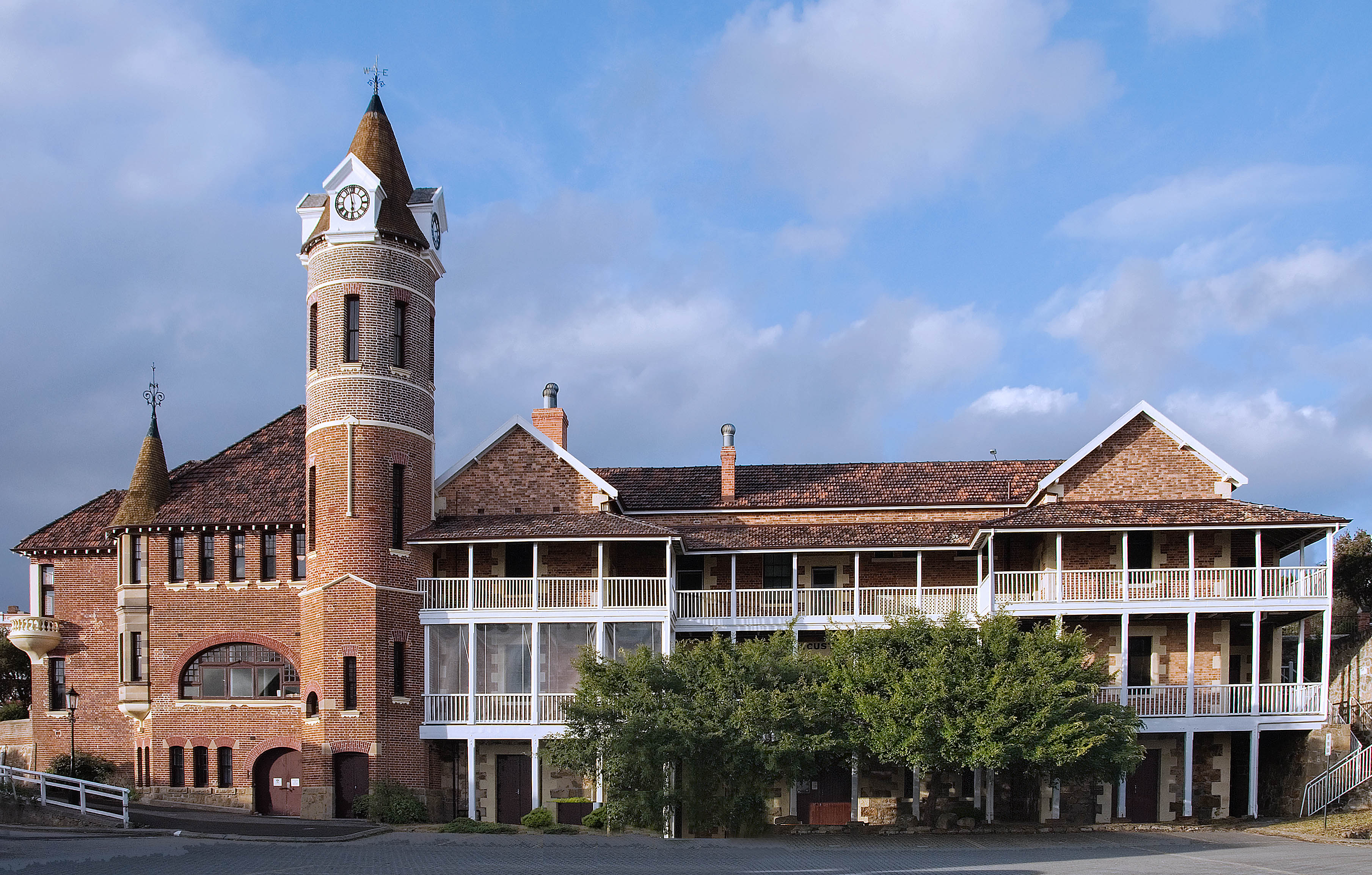
Old Post Office, south front

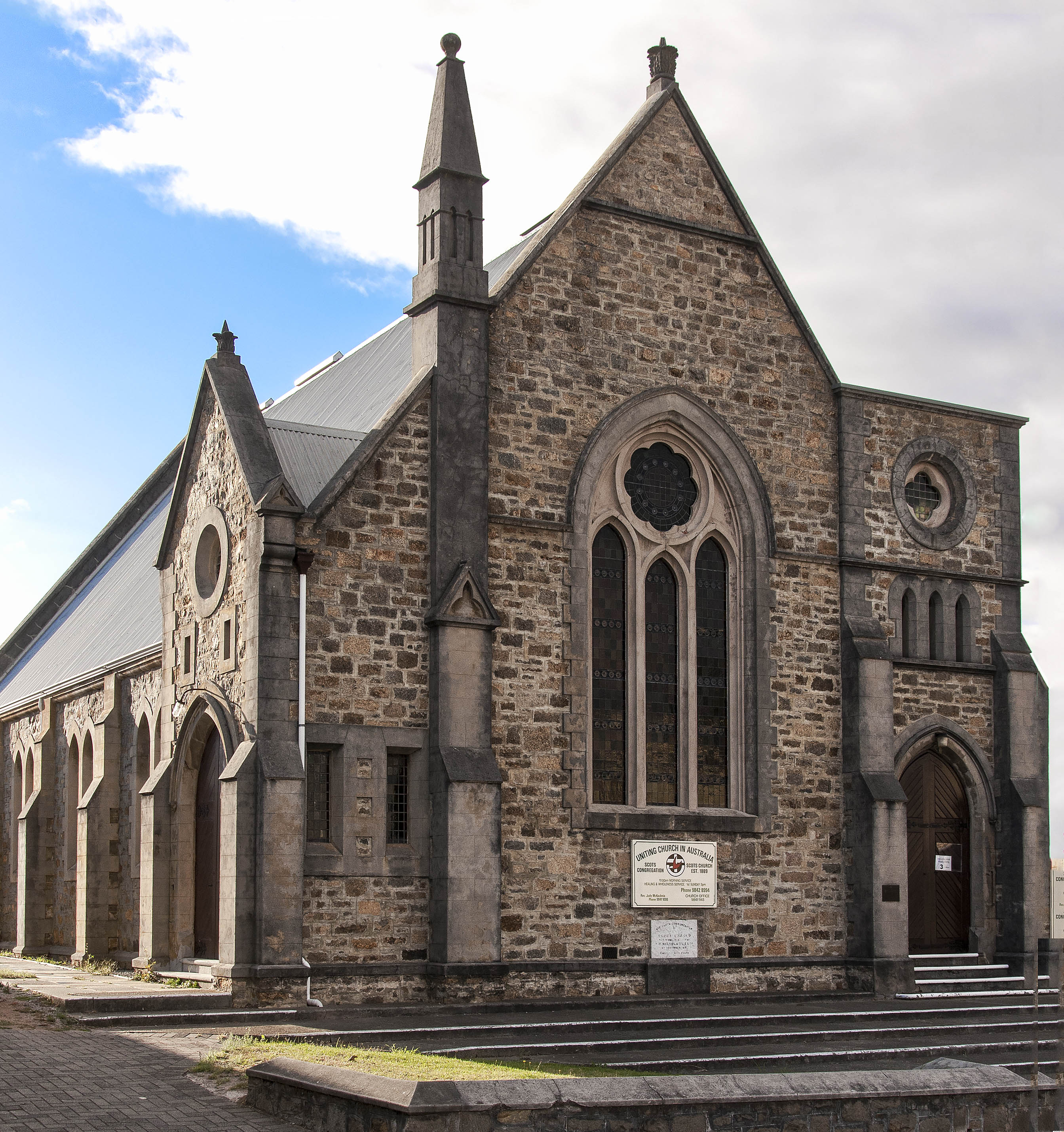
Scots Uniting Church

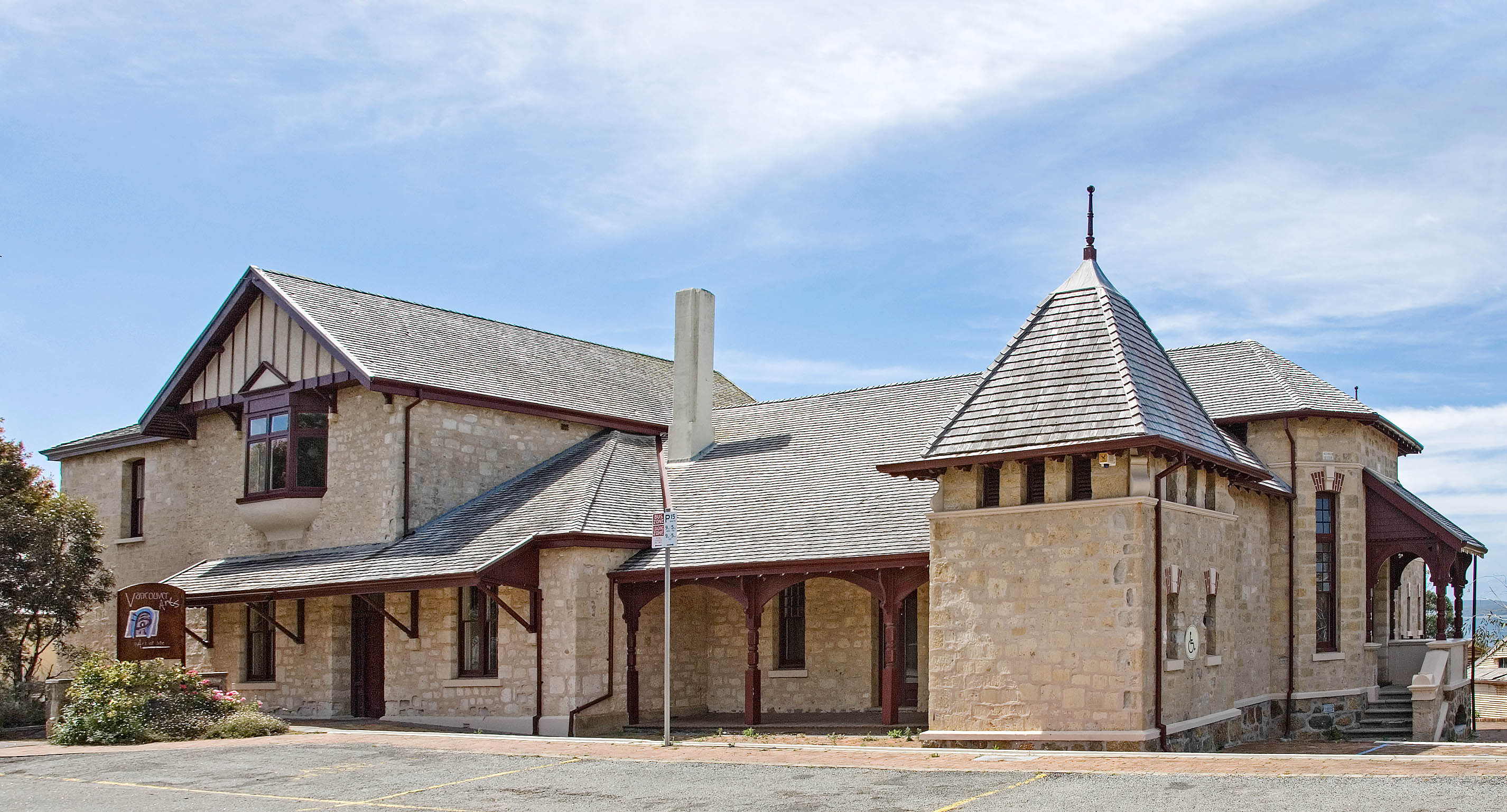
Vancouver House, formerly the Cottage Hospital

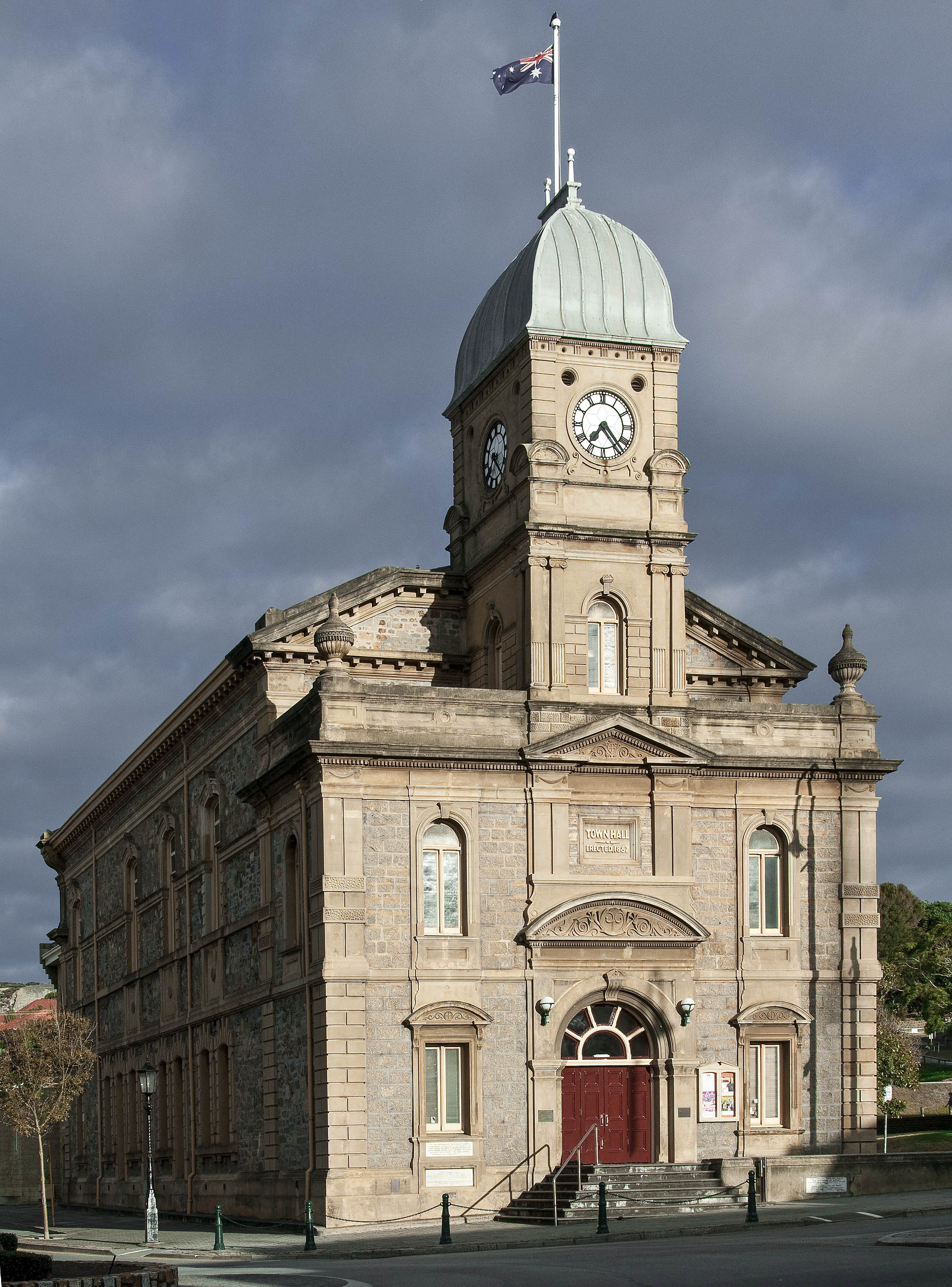
Town Hall, Albany

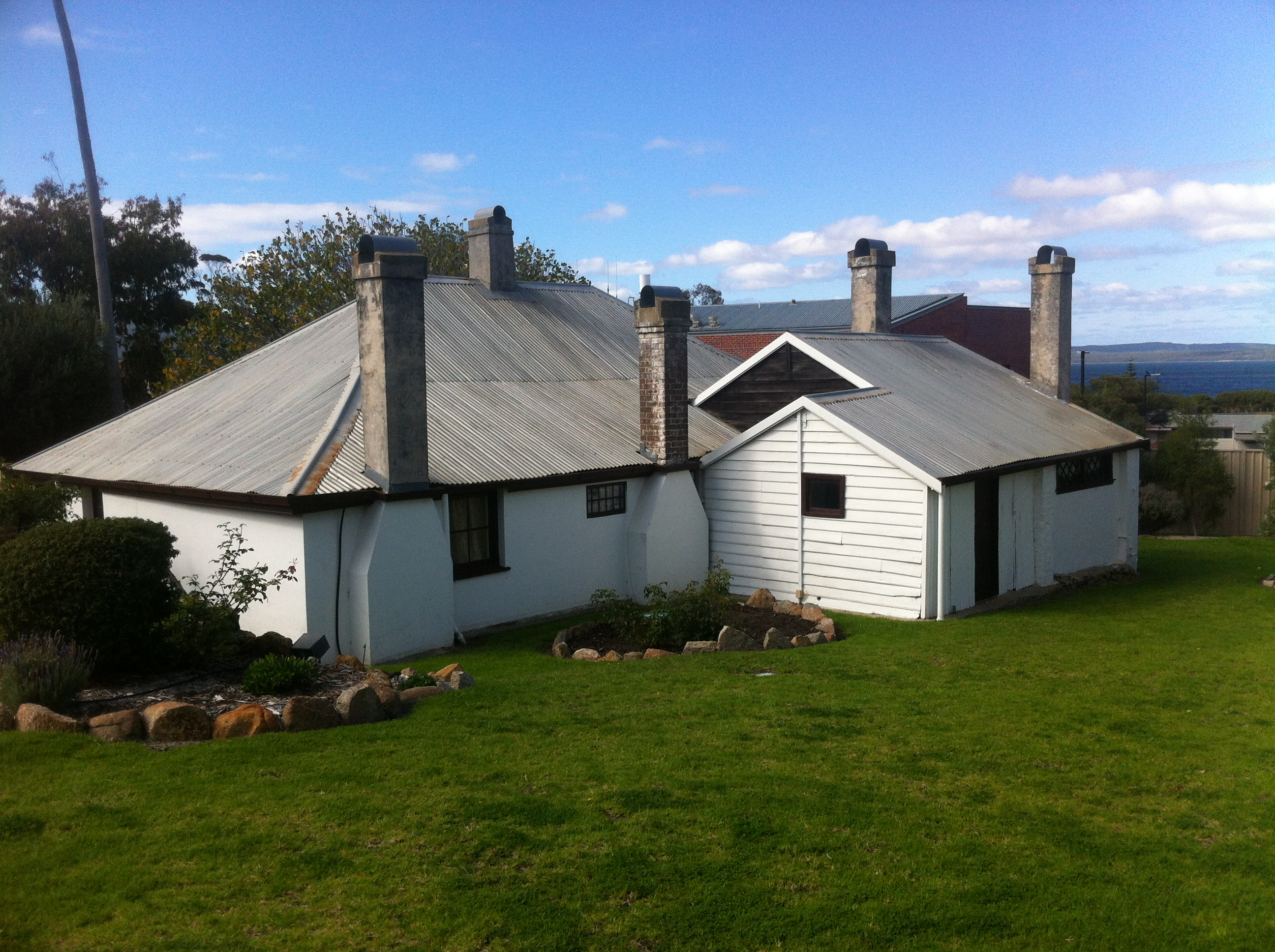
Patrick Taylor Cottage, Duke Street

Some of the above information is derived from the State Heritage Register where these places are registered. The assessment criteria contain more details.

== Demographics ==
As of the 2021 census, the urban population of Albany was 35,053 making it the state's sixth-largest population centre.

- Aboriginal and Torres Strait Islander people made up 4.1% of the population.
- 75.5% of people were born in Australia. The next most common countries of birth were United Kingdom 7.2%, New Zealand 1.7%, Philippines 1.7%, South Africa 1.2% and Scotland 0.7%.
- 87.7% of people only spoke English at home. Other languages spoken at home included Filipino 0.6%, Tagalog 0.6%, Afrikaans 0.6%, Karen 0.5% and Italian 0.5%.
- The most common religious denominations were Anglican 11.9% and Catholic 10.7%. 49.9% had no religion and 7.5% did not respond.

== Geography ==
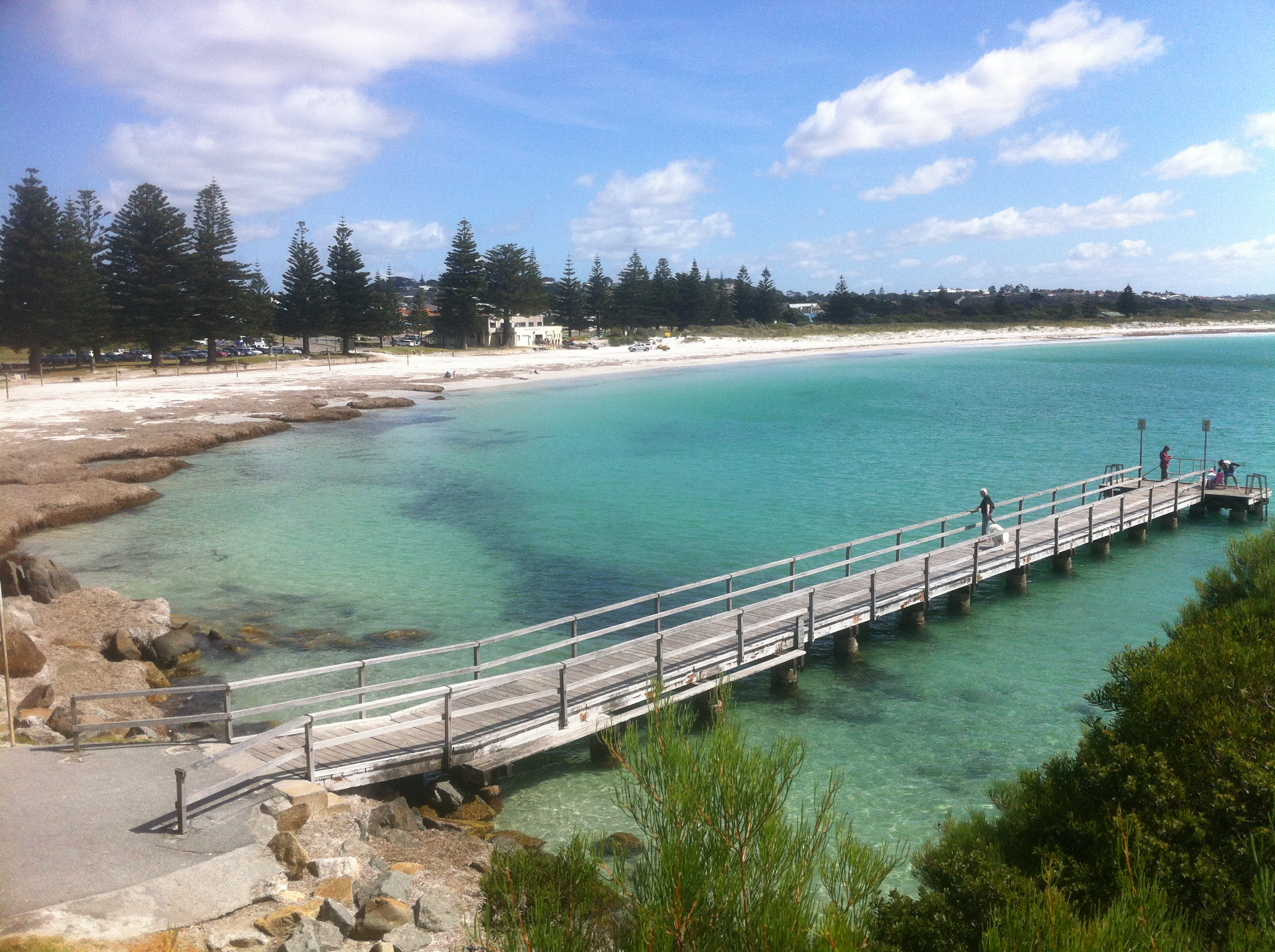
Ellen Cove, Middleton Beach, Albany

The city centre of Albany is located between the hills of Mount Melville and Mount Clarence, which look down into Princess Royal Harbour. Many beaches surround Albany, with Middleton Beach being the closest to the town centre. Other popular beaches include Frenchman Bay and Muttonbird Island.

Albany is 418 km (260 mi) SSE of the state capital, Perth, to which it is linked by Albany Highway.

=== Wine region ===
Albany is a sub-region of the Great Southern region of Western Australia.

=== Coastline ===
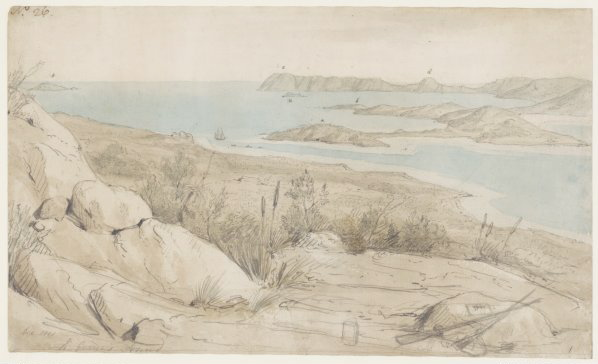
King George Sound, painted in 1803 by William Westall

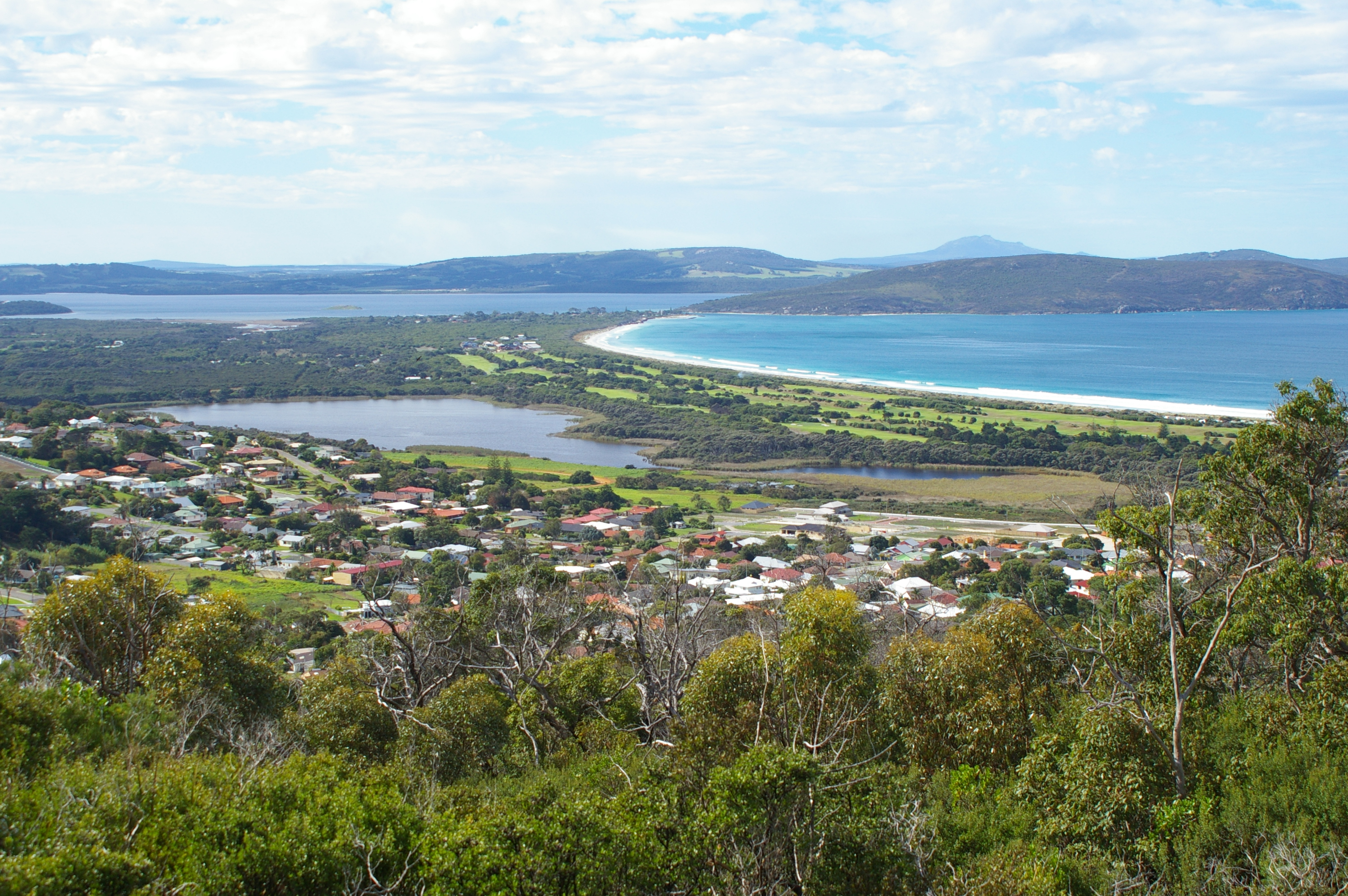
View of Lake Seppings from Mount Clarence

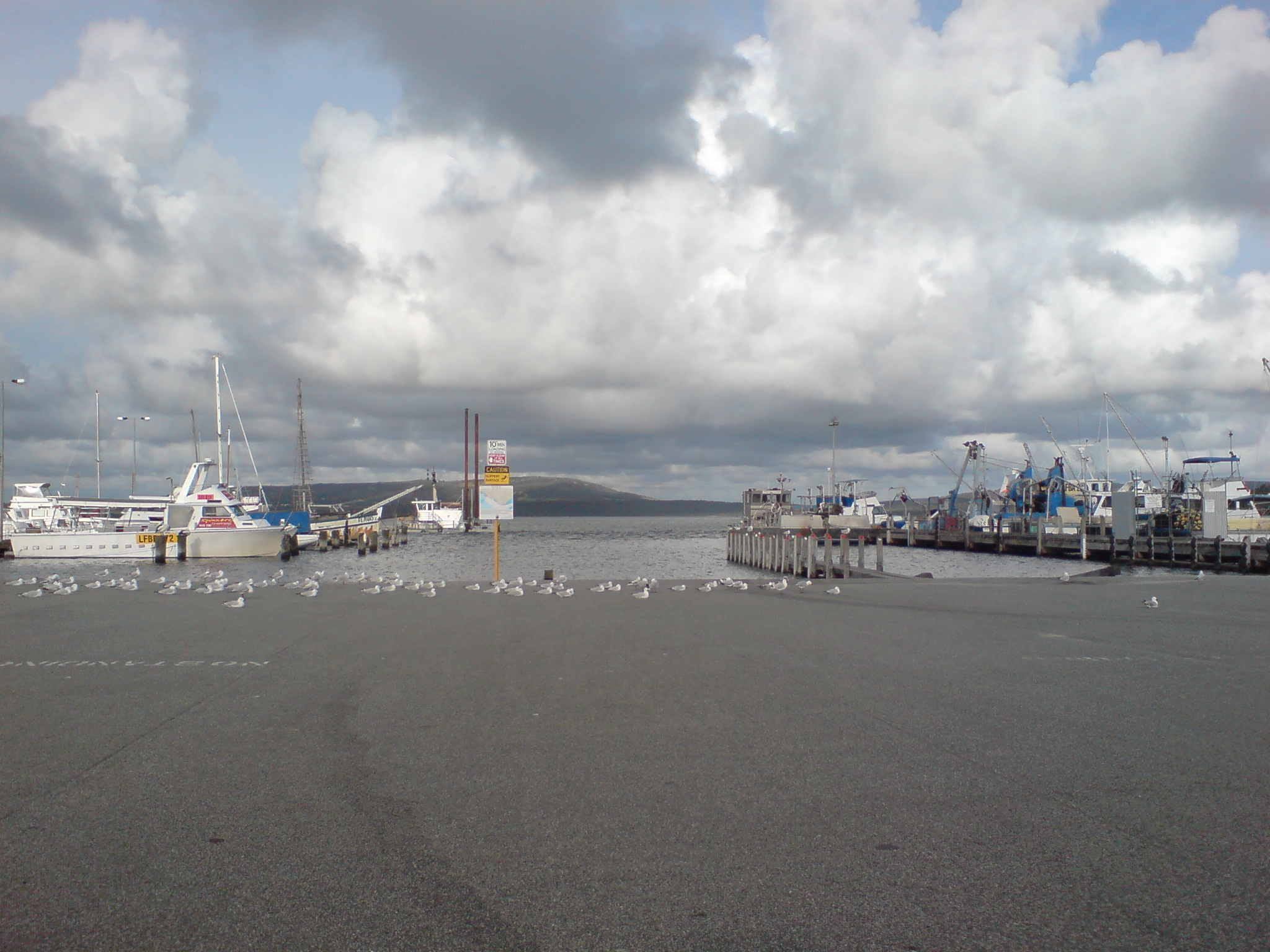
Emu Point Boat pens and ramp

The Albany coastline is notorious for deaths due to king waves washing people off rocks. The Torndirrup National Park features some of the more rugged coastline in the area. However, there are many beaches that are safe and usable.

Betty's Beach was named after Betty Jones, who used to go camping there with her family; the beach was initially called Betty's Bay.

Frenchman Bay Beach is adjacent to the Torndirrup National Park, and was originally called Quarantine Bay, owing to the quarantine station set up by the British in 1826 on Mistaken Island at the northern end of Goode Beach.

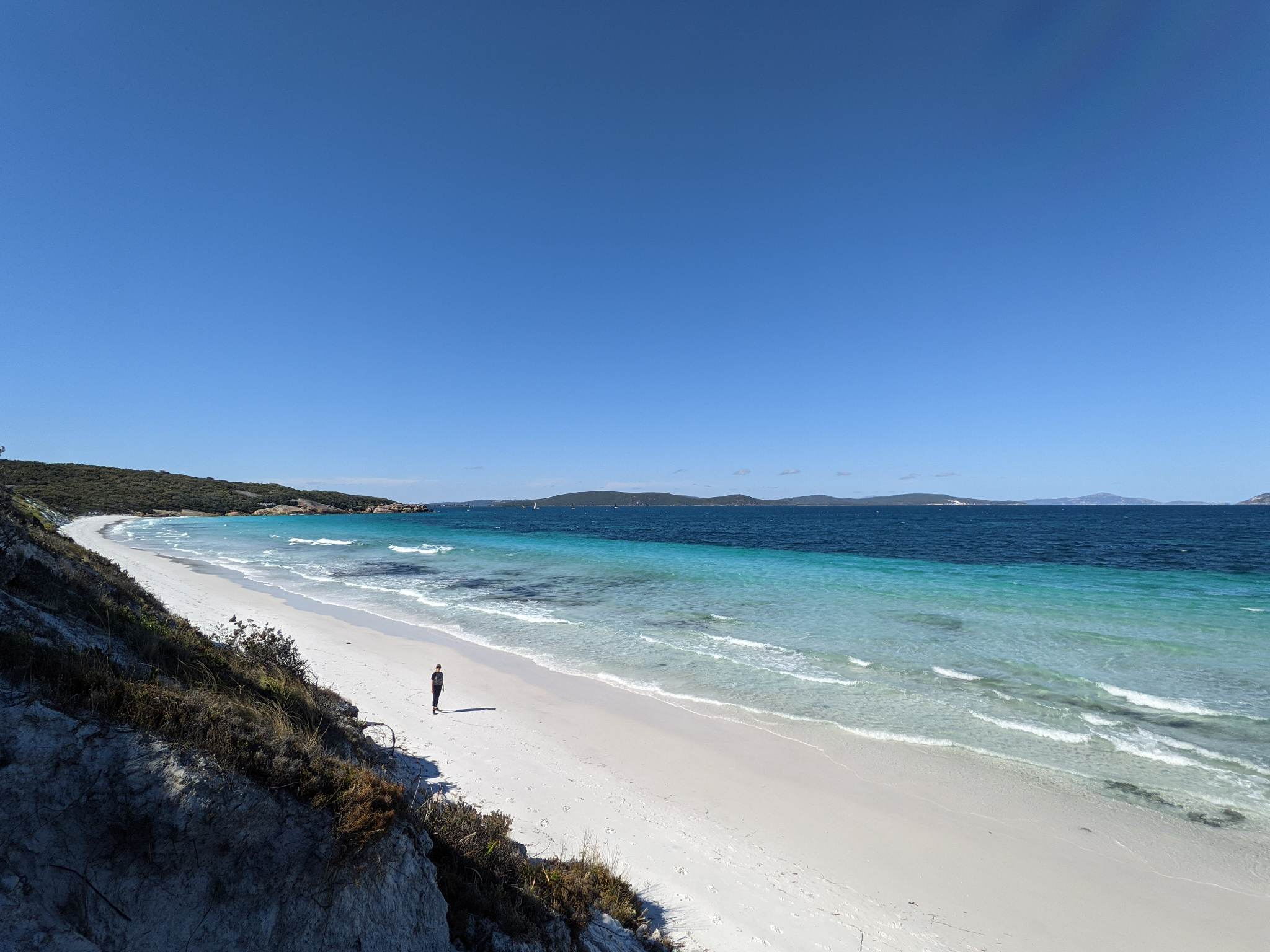
Beach on the southern eastern side of Vancouver Peninsula

Misery Beach, located 20 km (12 mi) south of Albany, was so named owing to the location of the whaling station at Albany that operated until 1978, causing offal to be washed ashore at Misery Beach and its sand and waters to be stained red. However, the beach was named Tourism Australia Best Beach 2022 by Tourism Australia, described a "[ticking] all the boxes of what the typical beachgoer is looking for – uncrowded, crystal-white sand, turquoise waters and a very dramatic granite backdrop".

Other beaches include:

- Emu Point
- Gull Rock Beach, also known as Boiler Beach
- Middleton Beach
- Nanarup Beach
- Muttonbird Beach
- Cosy Corner
- Two Peoples Bay, including Little Beach and Waterfall Beach

=== Climate ===
Albany has a warm-summer Mediterranean climate (Köppen Csb) with dry, warm summers, mild, wet winters, and pleasant springs and autumns. Summers have short spells of very hot weather, but cool ocean breeze brings relief, especially during evenings and nights. The city is situated on what is promoted as the "Rainbow Coast", an appropriate title given the frequency of days with both sun and drizzle or showers. Albany has 44.8 clear days annually, just slightly lower than Melbourne's 48.6 days.

July is the wettest month, with a long-term average of 144 mm (5.67 in). Rain in excess of 0.2 mm (0.01 in) occurs on two days out of every three during an average winter. The driest month is February with a mean of 22.9 mm (0.90 in).

Albany received a record amount of rain on 20 November 2008 when violent storms swept across the Great Southern region. The town was flooded after 113.8 mm (4.48 in) of rain fell in a 24-hour period, the highest amount recorded since rainfall records began in 1877. The wettest month on record was June 1920 when 292.8 mm (11.5 in) fell, while February 1877 and February 1879 remain the only rainless months.

Climate data for Albany (35.03°S 117.88°E), 1991–2020, extremes since 1907
Month	Jan	Feb	Mar	Apr	May	Jun	Jul	Aug	Sep	Oct	Nov	Dec	Year
Record high °C (°F)	41.7 (107.1)	44.8 (112.6)	40.8 (105.4)	37.7 (99.9)	35.2 (95.4)	24.6 (76.3)	23.3 (73.9)	27.3 (81.1)	30.6 (87.1)	36.2 (97.2)	41.1 (106.0)	42.2 (108.0)	44.8 (112.6)
Mean maximum °C (°F)	30.7 (87.3)	29.5 (85.1)	32.7 (90.9)	29.3 (84.7)	25.8 (78.4)	22.0 (71.6)	21.0 (69.8)	22.9 (73.2)	25.2 (77.4)	26.9 (80.4)	30.0 (86.0)	29.2 (84.6)	35.6 (96.1)
Mean daily maximum °C (°F)	22.6 (72.7)	22.9 (73.2)	22.6 (72.7)	21.2 (70.2)	19.5 (67.1)	17.7 (63.9)	16.7 (62.1)	17.1 (62.8)	17.8 (64.0)	18.9 (66.0)	20.3 (68.5)	21.4 (70.5)	19.9 (67.8)
Daily mean °C (°F)	19.5 (67.1)	20.0 (68.0)	19.3 (66.7)	17.6 (63.7)	15.6 (60.1)	13.9 (57.0)	12.9 (55.2)	13.2 (55.8)	13.9 (57.0)	15.4 (59.7)	16.9 (62.4)	18.1 (64.6)	16.4 (61.4)
Mean daily minimum °C (°F)	16.3 (61.3)	17.0 (62.6)	16.0 (60.8)	13.9 (57.0)	11.6 (52.9)	10.0 (50.0)	9.1 (48.4)	9.3 (48.7)	10.0 (50.0)	11.9 (53.4)	13.4 (56.1)	14.8 (58.6)	12.8 (55.0)
Mean minimum °C (°F)	11.8 (53.2)	12.6 (54.7)	10.7 (51.3)	9.0 (48.2)	6.9 (44.4)	5.7 (42.3)	5.1 (41.2)	5.3 (41.5)	5.6 (42.1)	7.3 (45.1)	8.7 (47.7)	10.3 (50.5)	4.4 (39.9)
Record low °C (°F)	7.8 (46.0)	7.2 (45.0)	6.1 (43.0)	4.8 (40.6)	2.4 (36.3)	1.7 (35.1)	0.1 (32.2)	1.6 (34.9)	2.0 (35.6)	3.4 (38.1)	5.6 (42.1)	6.7 (44.1)	0.1 (32.2)
Average precipitation mm (inches)	20.3 (0.80)	19.3 (0.76)	39.5 (1.56)	58.8 (2.31)	87.2 (3.43)	123.3 (4.85)	128.5 (5.06)	129.6 (5.10)	105.2 (4.14)	62.7 (2.47)	51.3 (2.02)	31.7 (1.25)	857.4 (33.75)
Average precipitation days (≥ 1 mm)	4.2	3.8	6.7	9.3	12.2	14.6	16.4	16.3	14.2	10.2	7.7	5.6	121.2
Source: Bureau of Meteorology

Climate data for Albany Airport
Month	Jan	Feb	Mar	Apr	May	Jun	Jul	Aug	Sep	Oct	Nov	Dec	Year
Record high °C (°F)	45.6 (114.1)	44.0 (111.2)	41.2 (106.2)	38.8 (101.8)	32.6 (90.7)	24.8 (76.6)	22.5 (72.5)	26.2 (79.2)	27.9 (82.2)	33.6 (92.5)	39.2 (102.6)	42.8 (109.0)	45.6 (114.1)
Mean maximum °C (°F)	37.0 (98.6)	36.3 (97.3)	36.2 (97.2)	31.6 (88.9)	25.7 (78.3)	21.1 (70.0)	20.0 (68.0)	21.6 (70.9)	24.0 (75.2)	27.6 (81.7)	31.6 (88.9)	34.5 (94.1)	40.1 (104.2)
Mean daily maximum °C (°F)	24.8 (76.6)	24.9 (76.8)	24.1 (75.4)	21.9 (71.4)	19.0 (66.2)	16.7 (62.1)	15.8 (60.4)	16.2 (61.2)	17.3 (63.1)	18.8 (65.8)	20.9 (69.6)	23.1 (73.6)	20.3 (68.5)
Daily mean °C (°F)	19.3 (66.7)	19.7 (67.5)	18.8 (65.8)	16.8 (62.2)	14.4 (57.9)	12.4 (54.3)	11.7 (53.1)	11.9 (53.4)	12.7 (54.9)	14.0 (57.2)	15.9 (60.6)	17.8 (64.0)	15.5 (59.8)
Mean daily minimum °C (°F)	13.7 (56.7)	14.5 (58.1)	13.4 (56.1)	11.7 (53.1)	9.8 (49.6)	8.1 (46.6)	7.5 (45.5)	7.5 (45.5)	8.1 (46.6)	9.2 (48.6)	10.8 (51.4)	12.5 (54.5)	10.6 (51.1)
Mean minimum °C (°F)	7.5 (45.5)	8.7 (47.7)	7.4 (45.3)	5.7 (42.3)	4.1 (39.4)	3.0 (37.4)	2.2 (36.0)	2.6 (36.7)	3.5 (38.3)	3.8 (38.8)	5.5 (41.9)	6.5 (43.7)	1.5 (34.7)
Record low °C (°F)	4.8 (40.6)	5.1 (41.2)	4.3 (39.7)	3.2 (37.8)	1.9 (35.4)	0.0 (32.0)	−0.2 (31.6)	0.8 (33.4)	0.7 (33.3)	1.0 (33.8)	2.7 (36.9)	3.6 (38.5)	−0.2 (31.6)
Average precipitation mm (inches)	23.6 (0.93)	22.3 (0.88)	33.6 (1.32)	61.3 (2.41)	89.8 (3.54)	108.0 (4.25)	119.3 (4.70)	106.8 (4.20)	88.5 (3.48)	70.8 (2.79)	47.0 (1.85)	27.8 (1.09)	798.1 (31.42)
Average precipitation days (≥ 1mm)	2.8	2.6	4.0	6.3	8.2	9.9	11.1	10.9	9.9	8.0	5.7	3.7	83.1
Average afternoon relative humidity (%) (at 3 pm)	55	56	58	61	64	68	68	66	65	65	63	57	62
Average dew point °C (°F)	12.4 (54.3)	12.9 (55.2)	12.5 (54.5)	11.6 (52.9)	10.3 (50.5)	9.2 (48.6)	8.3 (46.9)	8.0 (46.4)	8.8 (47.8)	9.9 (49.8)	11.1 (52.0)	11.7 (53.1)	10.6 (51.0)
Mean monthly sunshine hours	251.1	209.1	204.6	186.0	167.4	153.0	170.5	189.1	189.0	210.8	222.0	244.9	2,397.5
Source: Bureau of Meteorology (dew point at 3 pm)

== Industry ==
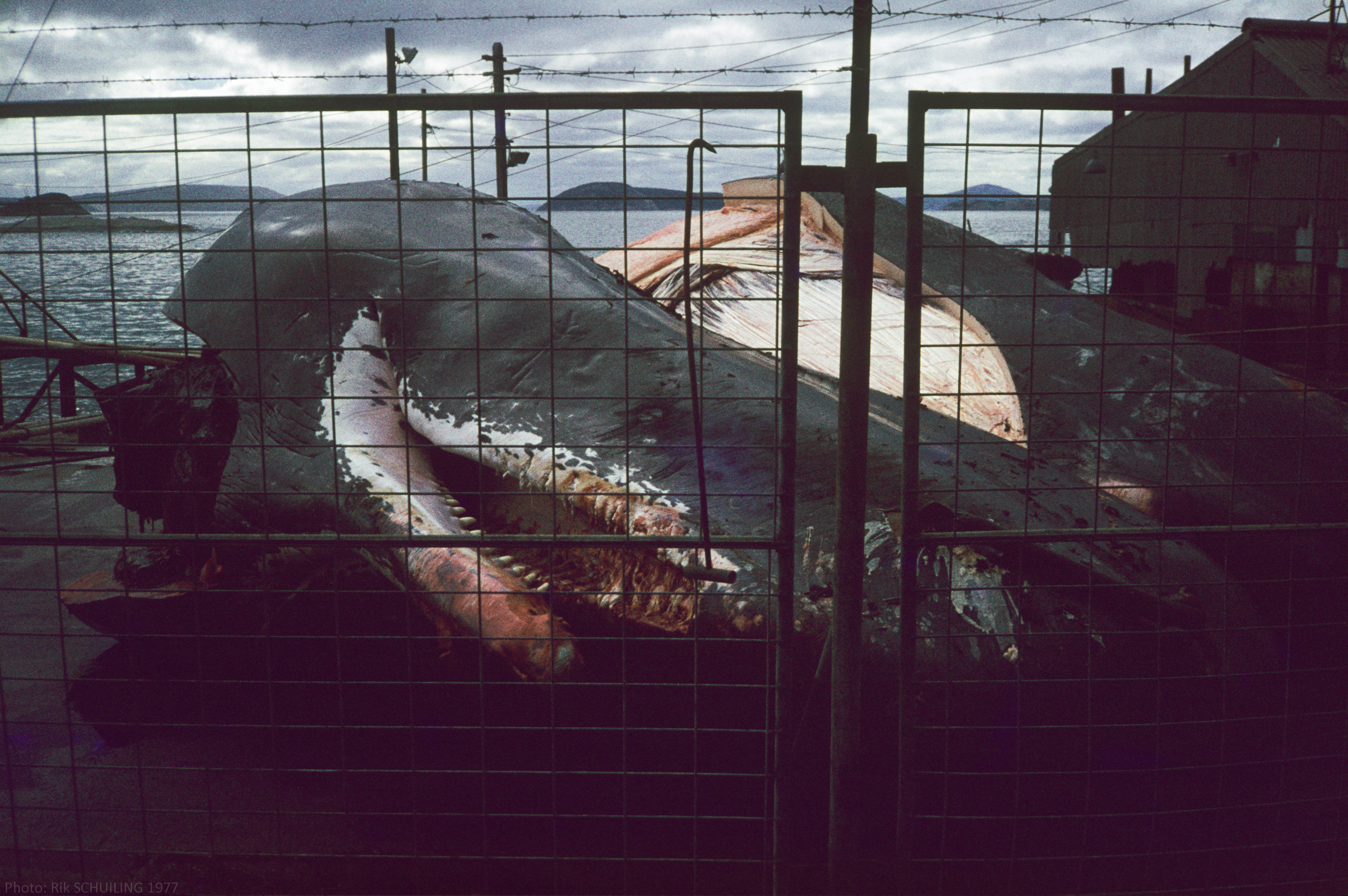
Sperm whale remains at the Albany Whaling Station in July 1977, the year before its closure

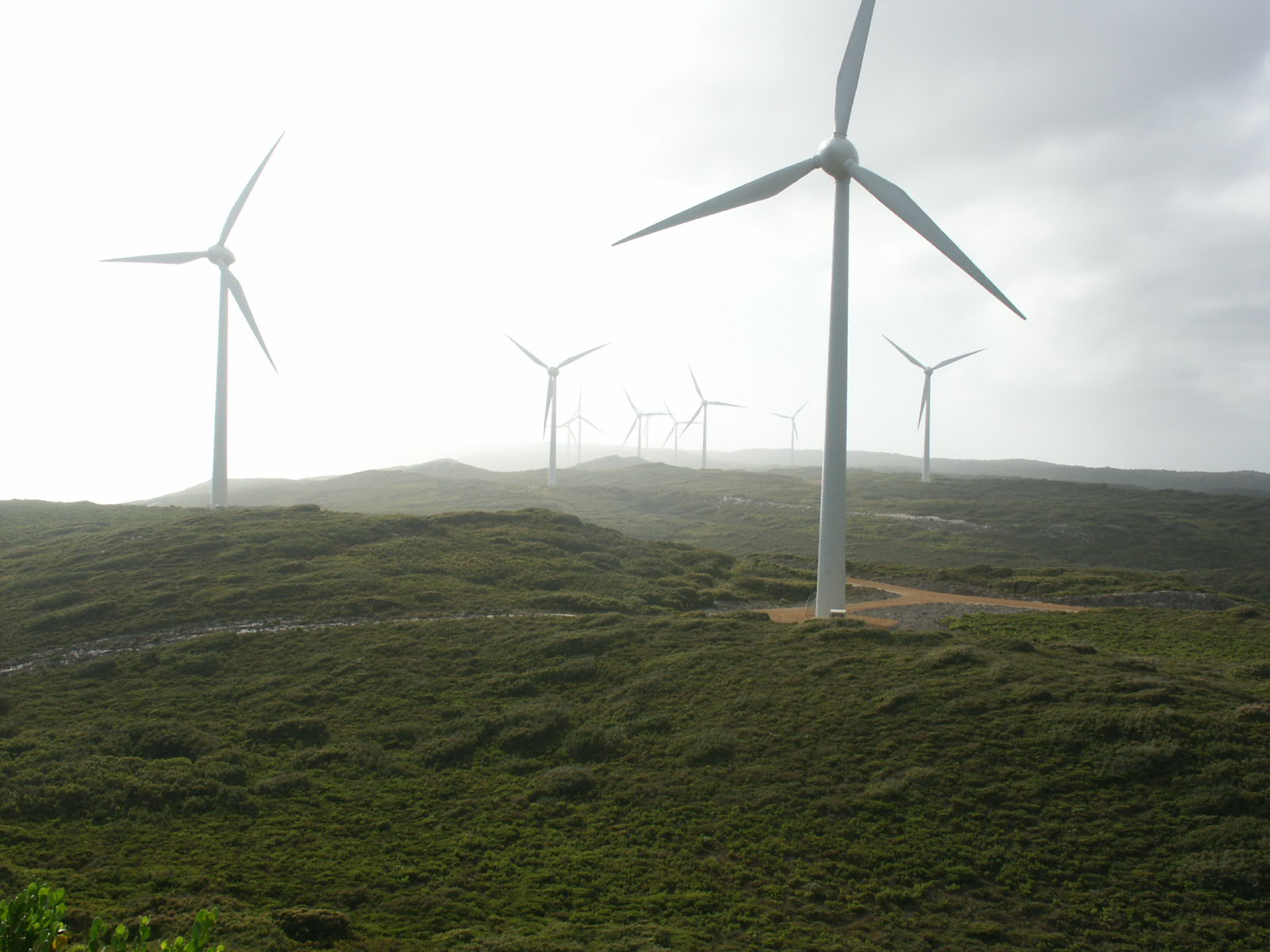
Wind farm at Albany

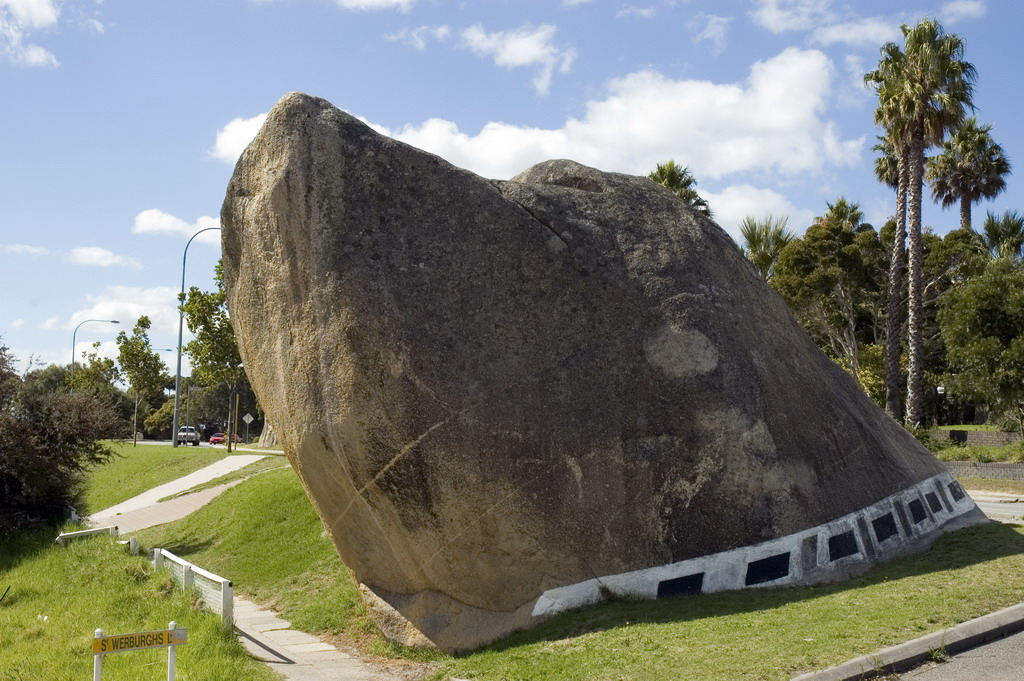
Dog Rock (2006)

Princess Royal Harbour panorama

Albany's main industries are tourism, fishing, timber (wood chips) and agriculture. From 1952 to 1978 whaling was a major source of income and employment for the local population.

The Whaling Station, which closed operations in 1978 following a major conservation campaign, has been converted to a museum of whaling and features one of the 'Cheynes' whale chasers that were used for whaling in Albany. The station was the last operating land based whaling station in the southern hemisphere and the English-speaking world at the time of closure.

The Western Power Wind Farm is located at Sand Patch, to the west of Albany. The wind farm, originally commissioned in 2001 with 12 turbines, now has 18 turbines, driven by strong southerly winds, and can generate up to 80% of the city's electricity usage.

Albany has a number of historical sites including the Museum, Albany Convict Gaol, The Princess Royal Fortress (commonly known as The Forts) and Patrick Taylor Cottage, one of the oldest dwellings in Western Australia, c. 1832. Albany has a great deal of historical significance to Western Australia.

Natural sights along the rugged coastline include the 'Natural Bridge' and the 'Gap'. The beaches have pristine white sand. The destroyer HMAS Perth was sunk in King George Sound in 2001 as a dive wreck. Albany is also close to two low mountain ranges, the Porongurups and Stirling Ranges.

Albany is the southern terminus of the Bibbulmun Track walking trail.

Albany is the southern terminus of the Munda Biddi Trail off-road cycling trail.

Albany is home to HMAS Albany (based in Darwin) and the adopted home port of the Royal Australian Navy frigate HMAS Anzac. Albany is frequently visited by other warships.

== Transport ==
Albany has a city bus service run by Swan Transit under the TransAlbany brand with five town routes. Albany is connected to Perth with road-coach services via Walpole and Bunbury; via Katanning and Northam; via Kojonup and Williams. Transwa coaches also serve Jerramungup, Ravensthorpe and Hopetoun.

Rex Airlines, a national independent regional airline, provides 23 services a week between Perth and Albany Airport using 34-passenger turboprop Saab 340 aircraft.

Albany was served by the Albany Progress passenger train from Perth until 1978. The railway station reopened as a tourist information centre in 1994.

== Media ==
Albany radio stations include locally owned broadcaster GOLD MX as well as national broadcasters 783 Triple M (formerly 6VA and RadioWest), Vision FM, HitFM (formerly HOT FM), ABC Great Southern, ABC News, ABC Radio National, ABC Classic FM, Triple J, and Great Southern FM.

Below is a table showing the broadcast frequencies on which these services can be received.

Service	Broadcast frequency
ABC Local Radio	630 kHz AM
783 Triple M	783 kHz AM
GOLD MX	1611 kHz AM
Vision FM (Local)	87.6 MHz FM
ABC News	92.1 MHz FM
Triple J	92.9 MHz FM
Vision FM	93.7 MHz FM
ABC Classic FM	94.5 MHz FM
HitFM	95.3 MHz FM
ABC Radio National	96.9 MHz FM
Great Southern FM	100.9 MHz FM
HitFM (Local)	106.5 MHz FM

Localised television stations available in Albany include Seven Network, WIN Television Western Australia, West Digital Television, SBS Television and ABC Television Western Australia. Seven (formerly GWN7) broadcasts a half-hour local news program for regional WA, Seven News Regional WA (formerly GWN7 News) at 5:30pm on weeknights with a district newsroom covering Albany and surrounding areas based in the city.

Below is a table showing the full suite of digital television services available in Albany. These services are broadcast from Mount Clarence and cover the majority of the geographic area with some areas requiring a signal to be received from the Southern Agricultural site at Mount Barker. Both these transmission sites employ vertical polarity. Furthermore, a number of residents rely on receiving these services via satellite using the Viewer Access Satellite Television system.

LCN	Channel Name	Broadcast Ch. No.	Broadcast frequency
2	ABC TV	UHF 43	634.5 MHz
3	SBS	UHF 41	620.5 MHz
5	10 HD	UHF 44	641.5 MHz
6	7HD Regional WA	UHF 45	648.5 MHz
8	9HD	UHF 42	627.5 MHz
20	ABC HD	UHF 43	634.5 MHz
21	ABC TV	UHF 43	634.5 MHz
22	ABC Family/KIDS	UHF 43	634.5 MHz
23	ABC Entertains	UHF 43	634.5 MHz
24	ABC NEWS	UHF 43	634.5 MHz
30	SBS HD	UHF 41	620.5 MHz
31	SBS2	UHF 41	620.5 MHz
32	SBS WORLD MOVIES	UHF 41	620.5 MHz
33	SBS FOOD	UHF 41	620.5 MHz
34	NITV HD	UHF 41	620.5 MHz
35	SBS WORLD WATCH	UHF 41	620.5 MHz
36	NITV	UHF 41	620.5 MHz
50	10 Drama	UHF 44	641.5 MHz
55	10 Comedy	UHF 44	641.5 MHz
62	7two Regional WA	UHF 45	648.5 MHz
64	7mateHD Regional WA	UHF 45	648.5 MHz
67	TVSN	UHF 45	648.5 MHz
68	RACING.COM	UHF 45	648.5 MHz
80	9HD	UHF 42	627.5 MHz
81	9Gem	UHF 42	627.5 MHz
82	9Go!	UHF 42	627.5 MHz
85	9Life	UHF 42	627.5 MHz

Local newspapers are the Albany Advertiser (established 1888) and The Extra (owned by Seven Media Group, publishers of The West Australian). Local radio station GOLD MX is owned by local independent broadcaster Barricades Media.

== Sport ==
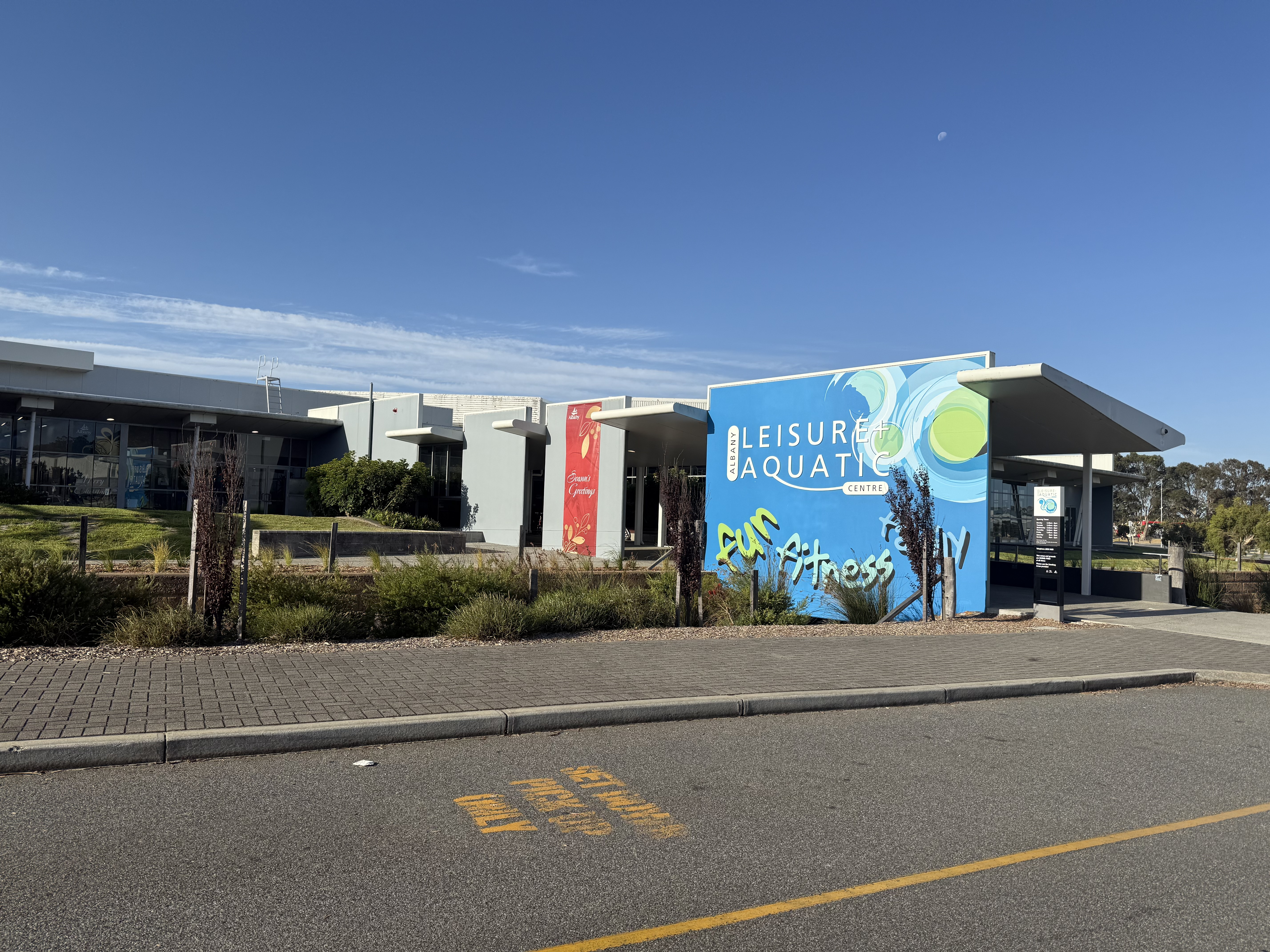
Albany Leisure and Aquatic Centre, January 2025

Two of Albany's major sports facilities are Collingwood Park Stadium in Collingwood Park and Centennial Oval in Centennial Park. Collingwood Park is home to North Albany Football Club while Centennial Oval is home to Royals Football Club.

Albany Leisure and Aquatic Centre is the home of Albany Basketball Association. The Rainbow Coast Raiders of the State Basketball League played at the Albany Sports Centre (33 Barker Road) between 1989 and 1999. 33 Barker Road later became the home of Albany Indoor Beach Volleyball.

Albany Leisure and Aquatic Centre hosted the Australian Boomers in a game against China in June 2012.

Albany Sea Dragons are the regions only rugby league club who partake in inter-regional WA competitions run by the NRL WA.

The outskirts of the city will soon be home to Western Australia's 3rd and longest permanent race circuit titled Albany Motorsports Park, which is projected to open in late 2028.

== Education ==
There are currently several primary schools, eight high schools and one university campus in the Albany area.

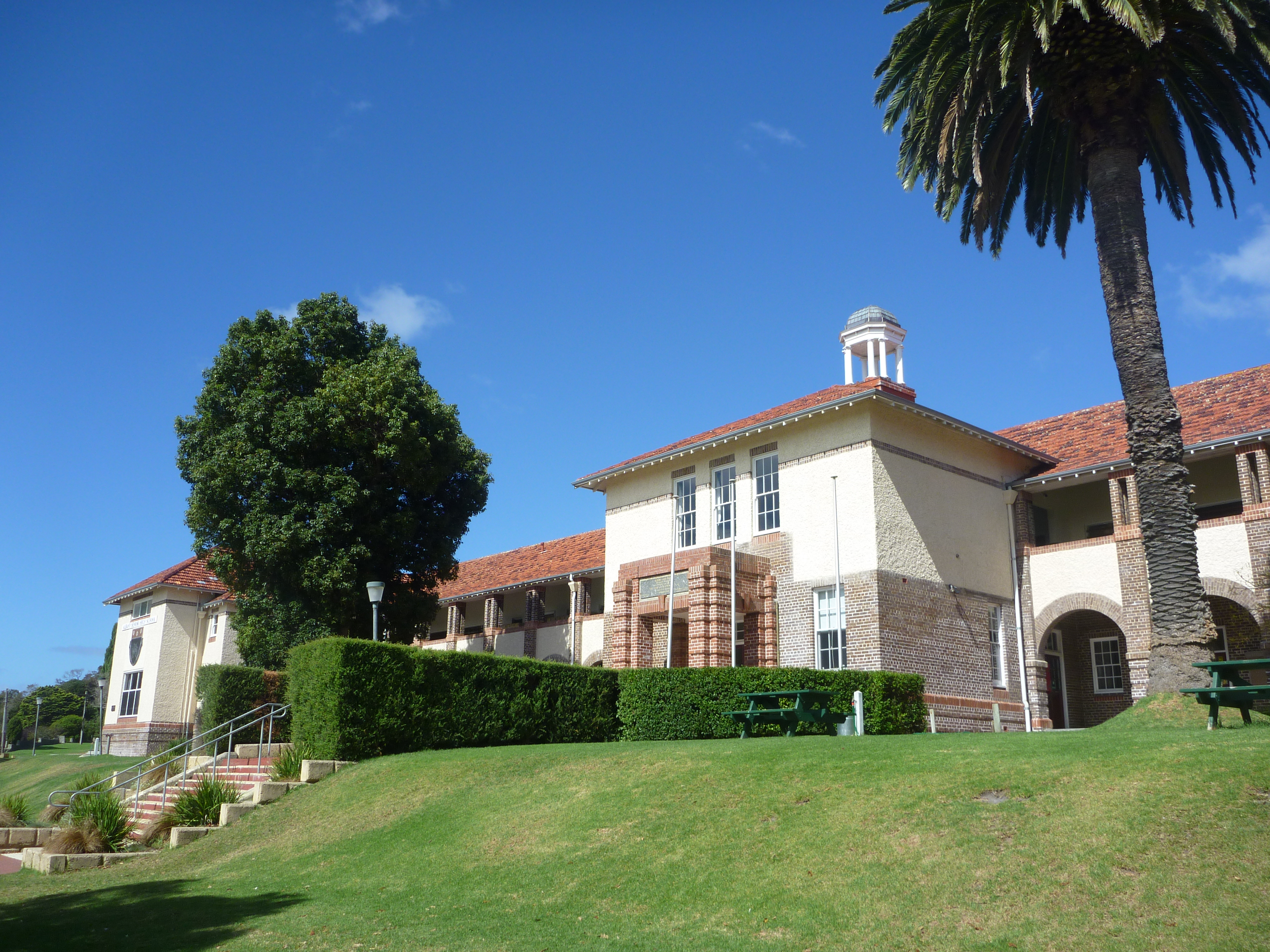
Albany Senior High School

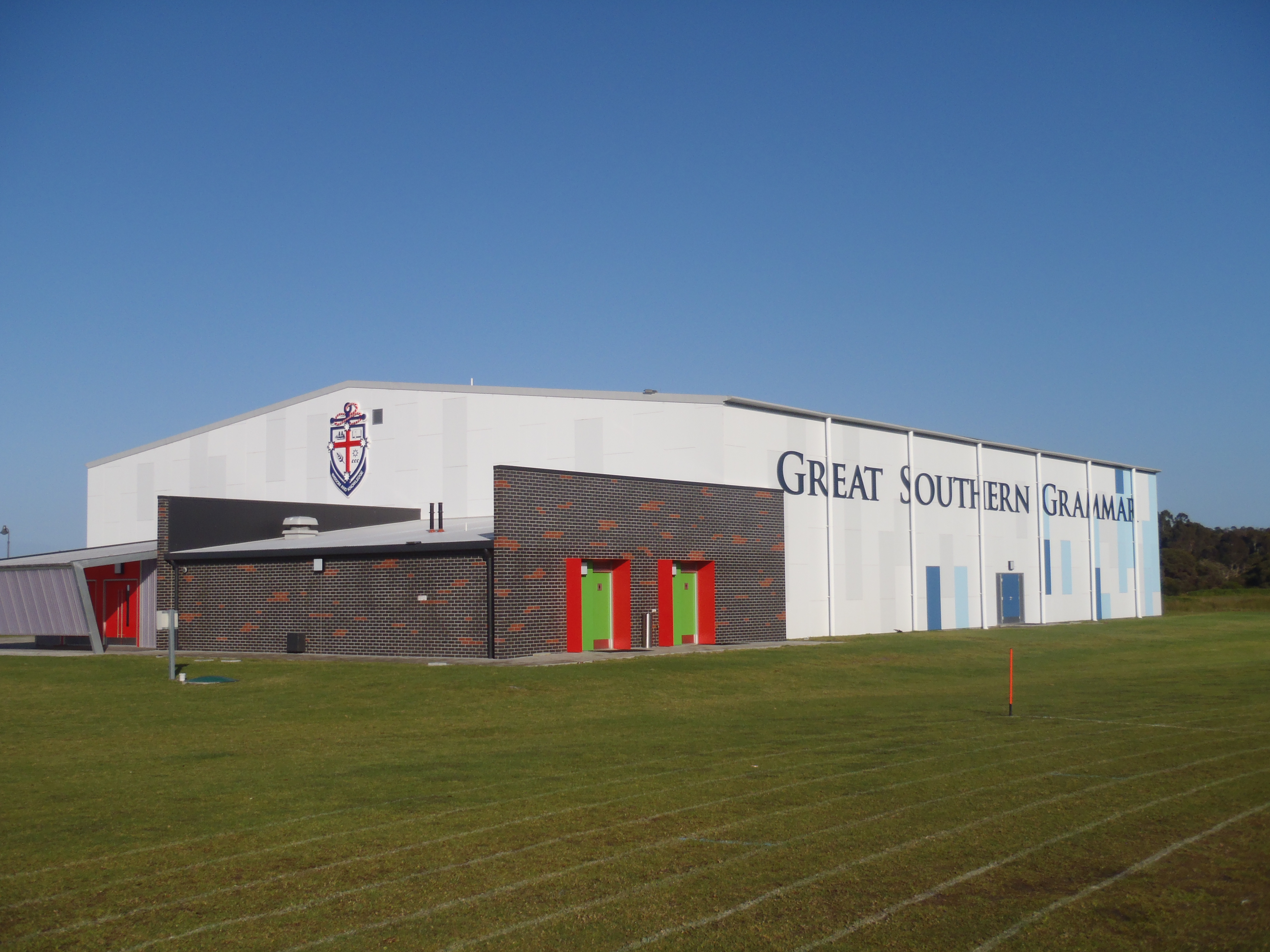
Great Southern Grammar Gym

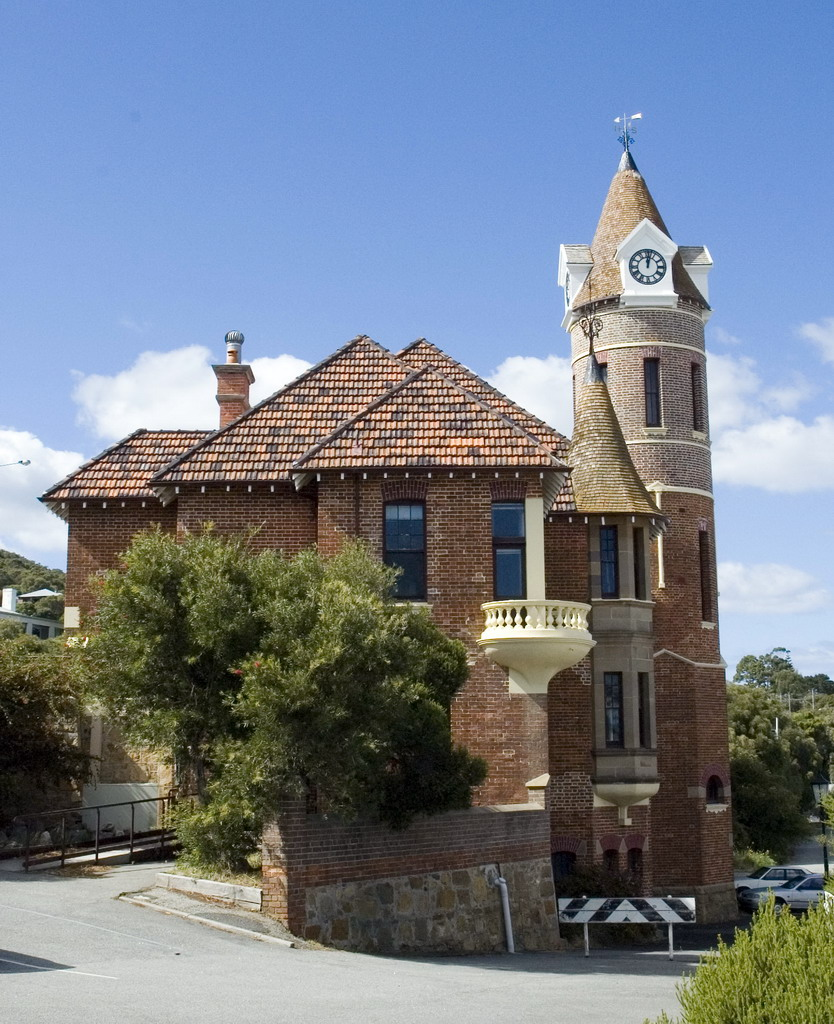
Albany UWA Centre 2006

=== Primary schools ===
- Albany Primary School
- Flinders Park Primary
- Mount Lockyer Primary
- Parklands School
- Spencer Park Primary
- Yakamia Primary
- Woodbury Boston Primary School
- OneSchool Global (Albany)
- Little Grove Primary School
- St Joseph's College
- Great Southern Grammar
- Bethel Christian School
- Australian Christian College Southlands
- John Calvin School

=== High schools ===
- Albany Senior High School 7–12
- Albany Secondary Education Support Centre 7–13
- Australian Christian College – Southlands K–12
- North Albany Senior High School 7–12
- Great Southern Grammar K–12
- St Joseph's College K–12
- Bethel Christian School K–12
- John Calvin School K–10
- OneSchool Global – Albany 3–12

=== Universities ===
- A campus of the University of Western Australia
- Some courses delivered by Curtin University

=== TAFE ===
- South Regional TAFE

== See also ==
- Albany Regional Prison
- City of Albany
- Electoral district of Albany
- Port of Albany

== Bibliography ==
- Arnold, Murray (2015) [Dissertation dated 2012]. A Journey Travelled: Aboriginal-European Relations at Albany and the surrounding region from first contact to 1926 (PhD). Crawley, Western Australia: University of Western Australia. ISBN 978-1-74258-663-2. OCLC 1126071148.
