= Patrick Taylor Cottage =

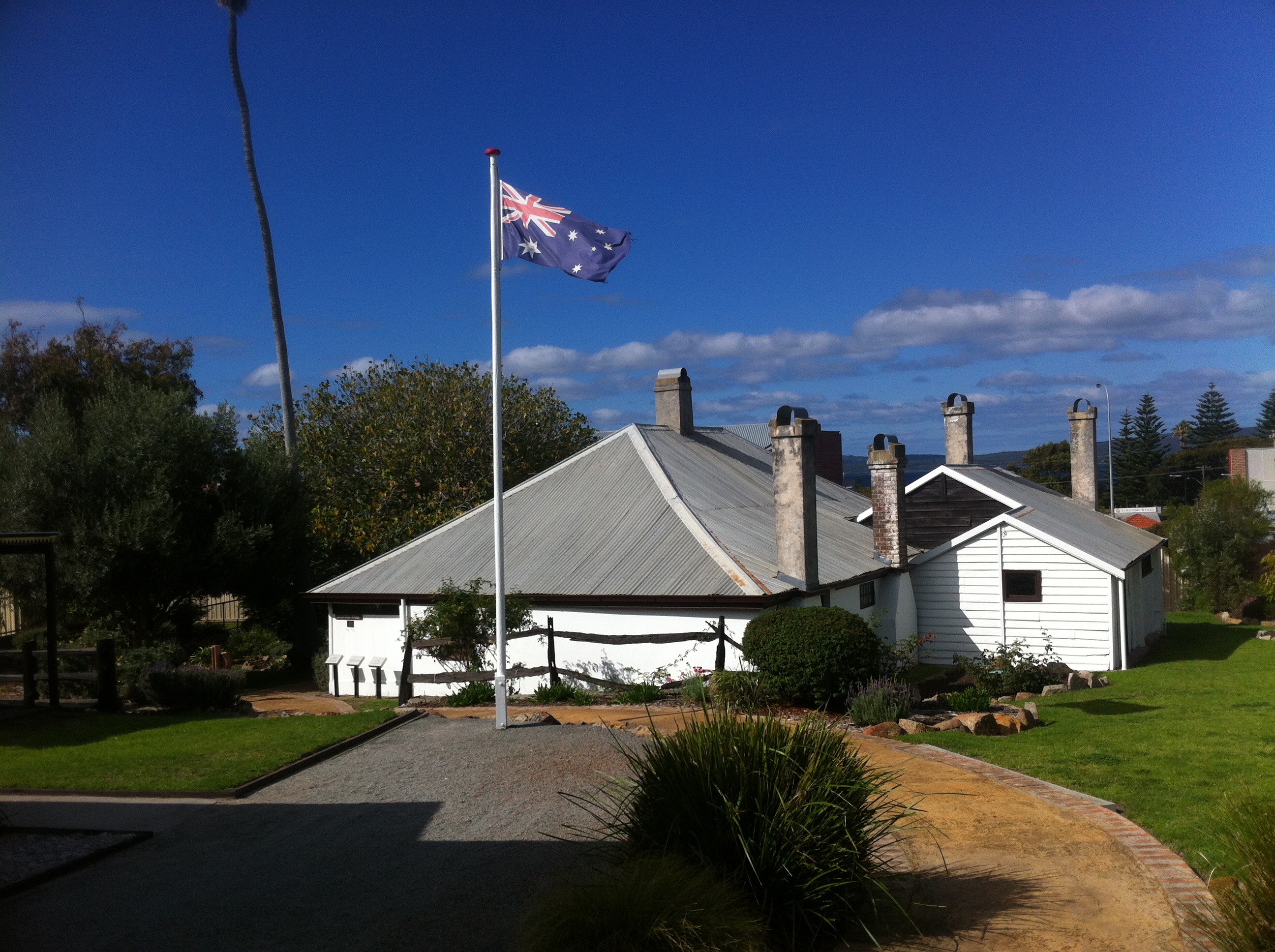
- Patrick Taylor Cottage from Duke Street
- Interactive map of the Patrick Taylor Cottage area

General information
- Type: Museum
- Location: Albany, Western Australia
- Coordinates: 35.0270°S 117.8811°E

Western Australia Heritage Register
- Type: State Registered Place
- Designated: 30 June 2009
- Reference no.: 19

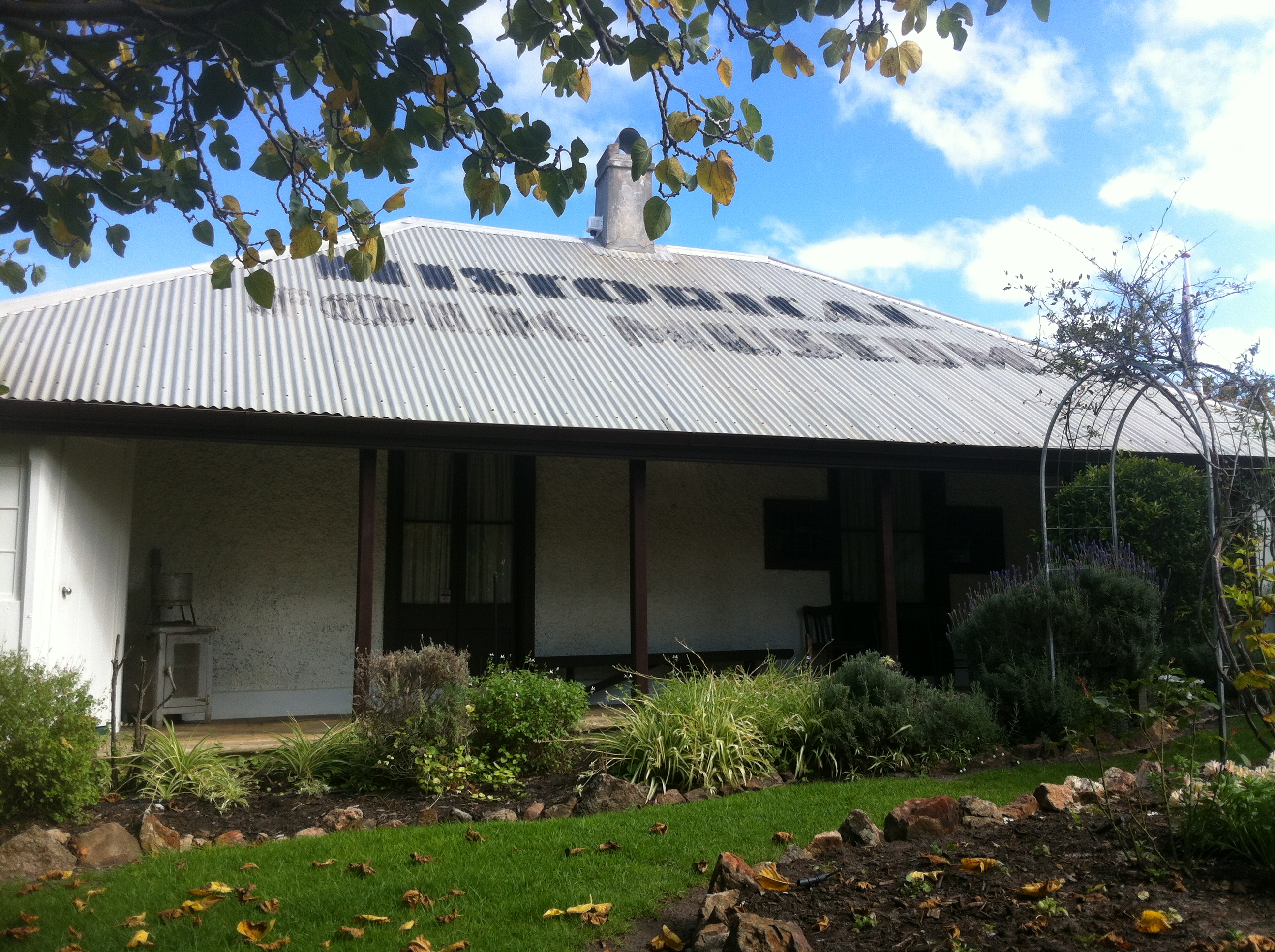
Cottage entrance

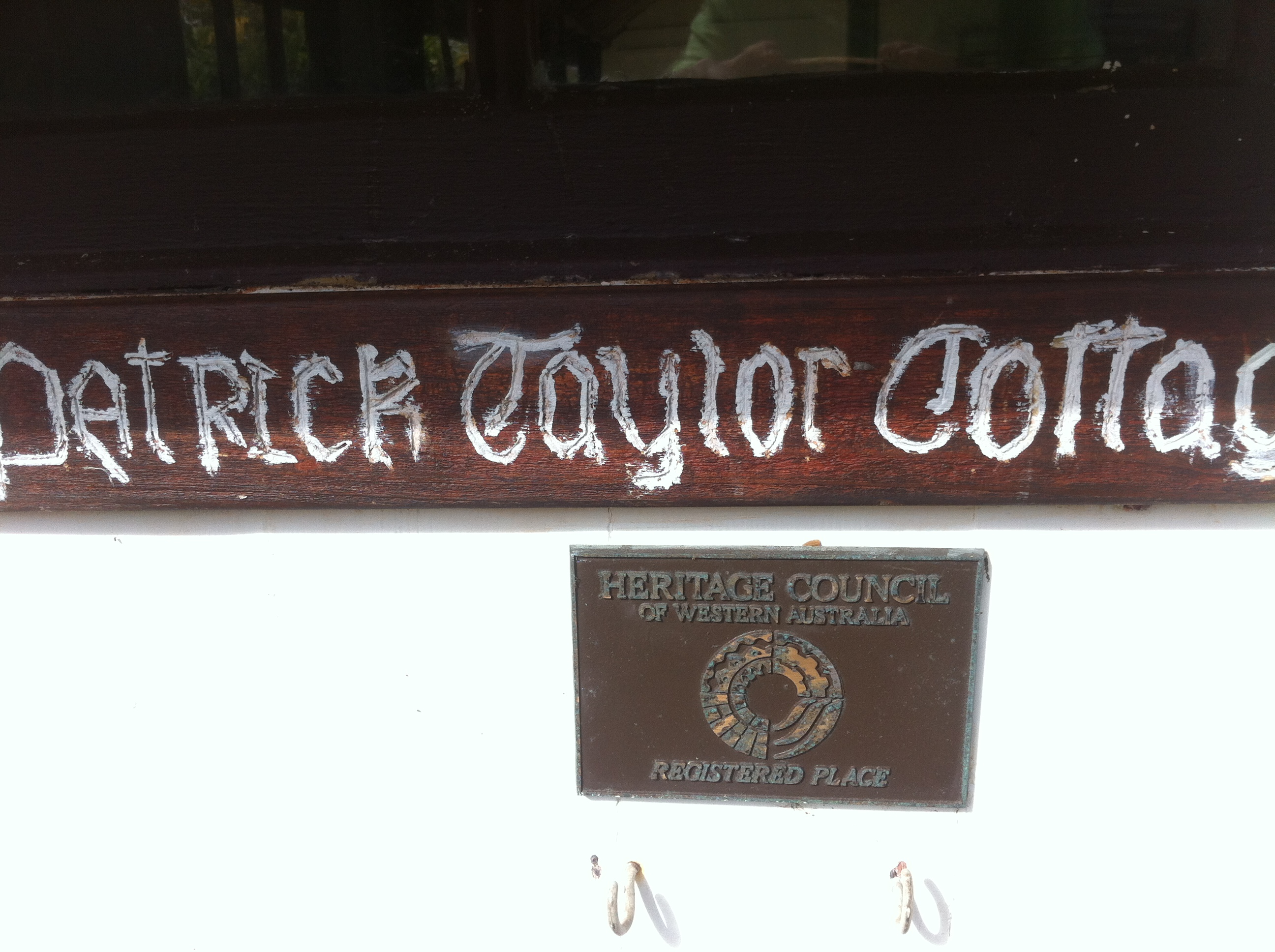
Patrick Taylor Cottage name plate and heritage stamp

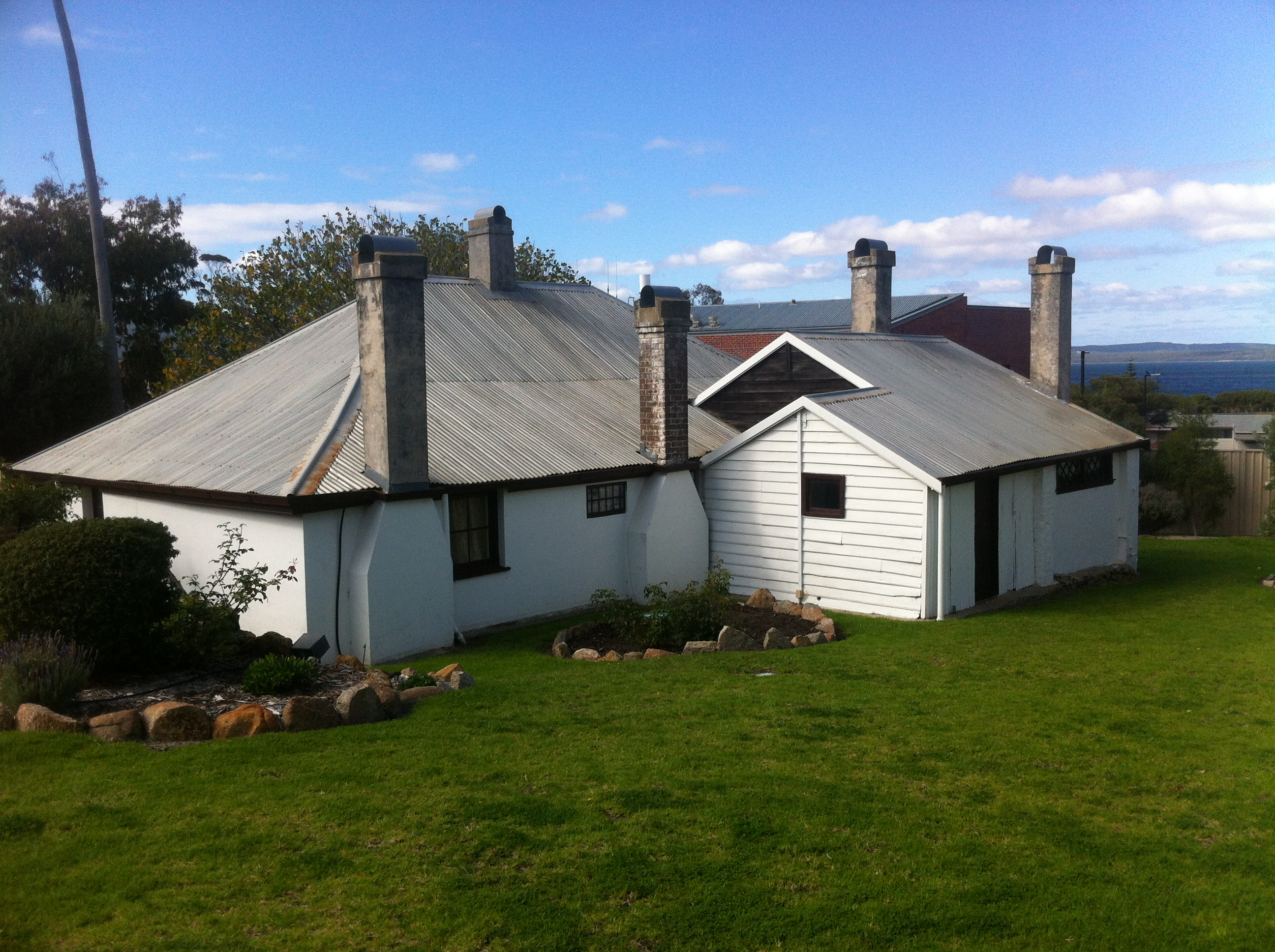
Patrick Taylor cottage museum

Patrick Taylor Cottage, also referred to as Patrick Taylor Cottage Museum, is a museum in Albany in the Great Southern region of Western Australia. It the oldest surviving dwelling in Western Australia.

== Description ==
Located below road level on Duke Street overlooking Princess Royal Harbour, the cottage is on the second oldest title in the area. The title dates back to when the town was a military outpost. The wattle and daub construction is representative of the traditional building methods used by the early settlers.

The cottage is a single storey residence with walls variously constructed of wattle and daub, mud-brick, wood-fired brick and framed weatherboard. It has a corrugated iron roof, replacing the original shingled roof. The cottage consists of eleven rooms: an entry, dining room, bedroom, nursery, family room, sewing room, kitchen, laundry, box room, parlour and side verandah. Much of the verandah has been walled in using weatherboard on studs and sun-baked bricks. It is surrounded by an English cottage garden. The entire site is found at the base of a gently sloping hill and has several mature trees and shrubs growing around the building.

== History ==
The building was constructed by the Morley brothers in 1832. John Lawrence Morley had served as a former sailor with the East India Company and was one of the first settlers in the area. He also leased the Old Farm at Strawberry Hill, and was the builder of Wollaston House. The cottage was originally set on a 240-acre (97 ha) block.

When Richard Spencer arrived in Albany in 1833 to take up the position of magistrate the cottage was one of "three miserable houses" mentioned in his records.

The building was sold to Patrick Taylor in 1835 by the Morleys for £400 on a much smaller block size. Taylor had arrived in Western Australia from Scotland in 1834. During the voyage he met Mary Yates Bussell; the two later married, with Patrick dying in 1877 and Mary living in the building until her death in 1887. Taylor's son inherited the property and it was still owned by the Taylor family in the 1950s.

The building was condemned as unfit for habitation in the 1960s, and the Albany Historical Society began campaigning to preserve it. In 1964 the cottage was opened as Albany's first museum. It is currently owned by the Albany Historical Society who use it as a museum. It contains 2,000 historical items including clocks, silverware, costumes and kitchenware.

The cottage was moved permanently onto the State Register of Heritage Places in 2009.

== See also ==
- List of places on the State Register of Heritage Places in the City of Albany
