= Shelter Island (Western Australia) =

Island in Western Australia

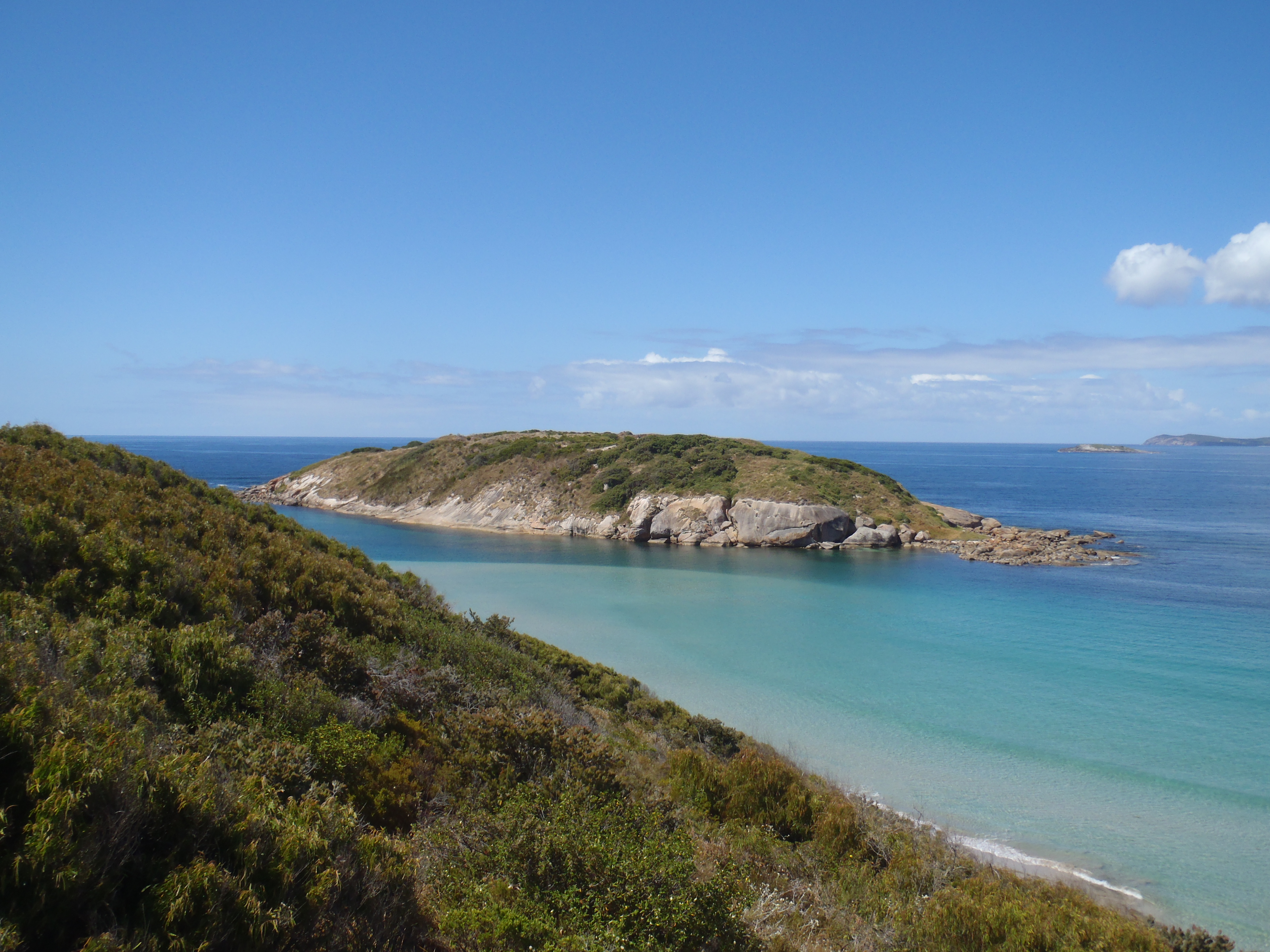
- Shelter Island from lookout over Muttonbird Beach

Geography
- Coordinates: 35°3′3″S 117°41′34″E

Administration
- Australia

Shelter Island is approximately 20 kilometres (12 mi) due west of Albany, Western Australia.

It is often referred to as Muttonbird Island as well. Some consider the much smaller, low-level granite islet located immediately to the east as Muttonbird Island, but this rock does not support a flesh-footed shearwater breeding ground (mutton birds), whereas Shelter Island does. Due to Albany's early occupation by sealers and small-boat operators there are a number of confused stories relating to place names (including Jimmy Newell's/Newhill's Harbour) along this particularly dramatic stretch. The beach immediately west of Shelter Island is known as Muttonbird Beach, and is popular for swimming, surfing, fishing, and four-wheel driving. That Muttonbird Beach is adjacent to Shelter Island lends strong support to the idea Shelter Island subsumed the original Muttonbird Island name due to another story, now forgotten.

Shelter Island is approximately 130 metres (427 ft) off-shore from Muttonbird Beach separated by a channel that has an average depth of 8 metres (26 ft) it is regarded as a suitable open-water dive site.

The island consists of a mass of granite but has sufficient soil for plant growth and is well vegetated on top. The island supports breeding populations of flesh-footed shearwaters and little penguins as well as small populations of feral cats and black rats.

Little penguins have also been seen on the island.

The total area of the island is 10 hectares (25 acres). It was declared a Class 1A Nature Reserve in 1973.
