= Princess Royal Drive =

Road in Albany, Western Australia

Princess Royal Drive Western Australia

General information
- Type: Road
- Length: 4.8 km (3.0 mi)

Major junctions
- West end: Menang Drive (State Route 103) Mount Melville
- Residency Road (Tourist Drive 257); York Street; Bolt Terrace
- East end: Brunswick Road Port Albany

Location(s)
- Major suburbs: Albany

Princess Royal Drive is a road that follows the northern shore of Princess Royal Harbour in Albany, Western Australia.

It is the harbour side end of York Street and runs parallel to Stirling Terrace for part of its route.

It has a walkway pass over it from Stirling Terrace across to the Albany waterfront.

It goes on the land side of the ANZAC Peace Park. It also runs south of Albany railway station, closer to the harbour.

It commences as a continuation of Menang Drive at its western end, and continues for just under five kilometres until it terminates at a junction with Brunswick Road below Mount Adelaide, which is in the eastern end of the Mount Clarence parklands.

The Port of Albany is situated along Princess Royal Drive, resulting in many heavy haulage trucks using to the road to access the port area and the adjacent CBH Group grain terminal.

Princess Royal Seafoods, a processing plant for pilchards, salmon and patagonian toothfish, is found along the road to the west of the port.
