= Menang Drive =

Western Australian ring road

Menang Drive Western Australia

General information
- Type: Road
- Length: 16.6 km (10 mi)
- Opened: 2007 (first section); 2024 (entire road)
- Route number(s): State Route 103

Major junctions
- Northeast end: Chester Pass Road (National Route 1) King River
- Albany Highway (State Route 30); South Coast Highway (National Route 1); Hanrahan Road / Lower Denmark Road / Frenchman Bay Road
- South end: Princess Royal Drive Mount Melville

Location(s)
- Major suburbs: Willyung, McKail, Gledhow, Mount Elphinstone

Menang Drive, also known as the Albany Ring Road, is a 16.6-kilometre-long (10.3 mi) expressway-standard ring road which frames the northern and western suburbs of Albany, Western Australia.

The road provides an uninterrupted free-flowing heavy haulage route from Chester Pass Road in the northeast to Princess Royal Drive and the Port of Albany in the south, in the process connecting the four major access roads that exit to the north and west of the city.

== History ==
Planning for the what was then known as the Albany Ring Road commenced in 1997, however it was not until 24 February 2006 when the then minister for planning and infrastructure, Alannah MacTiernan, announced $10.4 million in funding was awarded for the funding of Stage One.

=== Stage One ===
Stage One, which consisted of the section connecting Chester Pass Road to Albany Highway, commenced construction after an opening ceremony was held on 28 March 2006 Construction of the 6.5 km section took 13 months to complete and was opened on 27 April 2007. At the same time the road was renamed Menang Drive, which loosely translates to "southerners" and was named in tribute to the Mineng indigenous group that inhabited the area.

=== Stages Two & Three ===
In 2012, $1 million in joint funding between the state and federal governments was made available for the planning and detailing of Menang Drive down to the Port of Albany. This work was undertaken between 2012 and 2015

On 13 July 2020, it was announced that construction of the $175 million Stage Two extension would commence in September 2020. The scope consisted of the conversion of the intersection with Albany Highway to a grade-separated interchange as well as an extension to Lancaster Road. The interchange opened to traffic in April 2022.

The final designs for Stage Three were issued on 1 September 2021 and involved modifications to the interchanges with South Coast Highway and Hanrahan/Frenchman Bay Roads. Construction commenced in March 2022 with the full extension opened to traffic on 19 May 2024

In February 2024, it was announced that the intersection between Menang Drive and Chester Pass Road would be made partially grade-separated, with the movement from Chester Pass Road southbound to Menang Drive westbound moved onto a flyover. The $37 million project commenced construction in late 2024.

== See also ==
- Mandurah Road - a partial ring road constructed around the city of Mandurah.
- Robertson Drive and Wilman Wadandi Highway, the inner and outer Ring Roads that bypass the city of Bunbury.
