= Eyre Park =

Park in Albany, Western Australia

Coordinates: 35.0246°S 117.9101°E

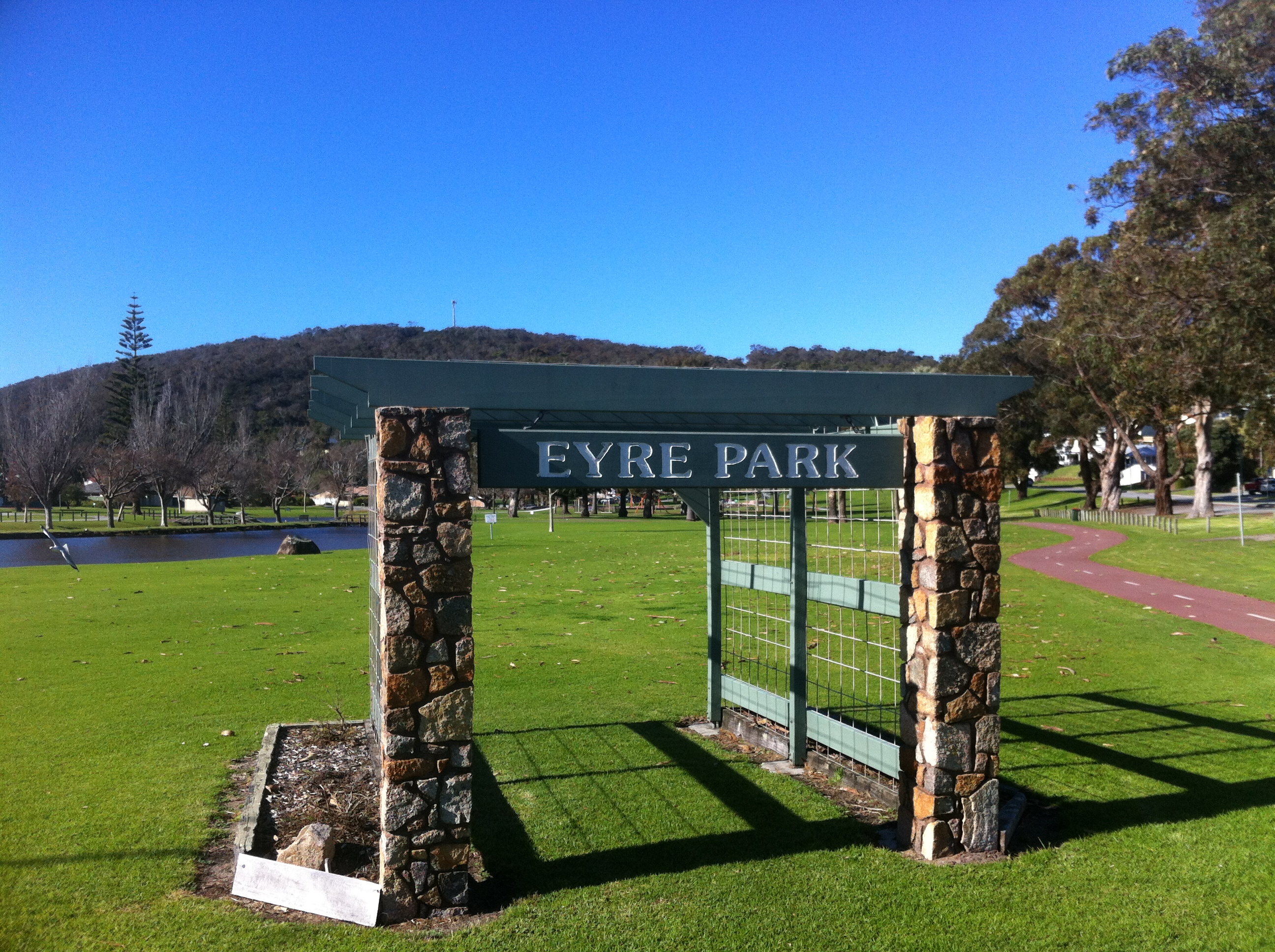
Eyre Park entrance near Middleton Road

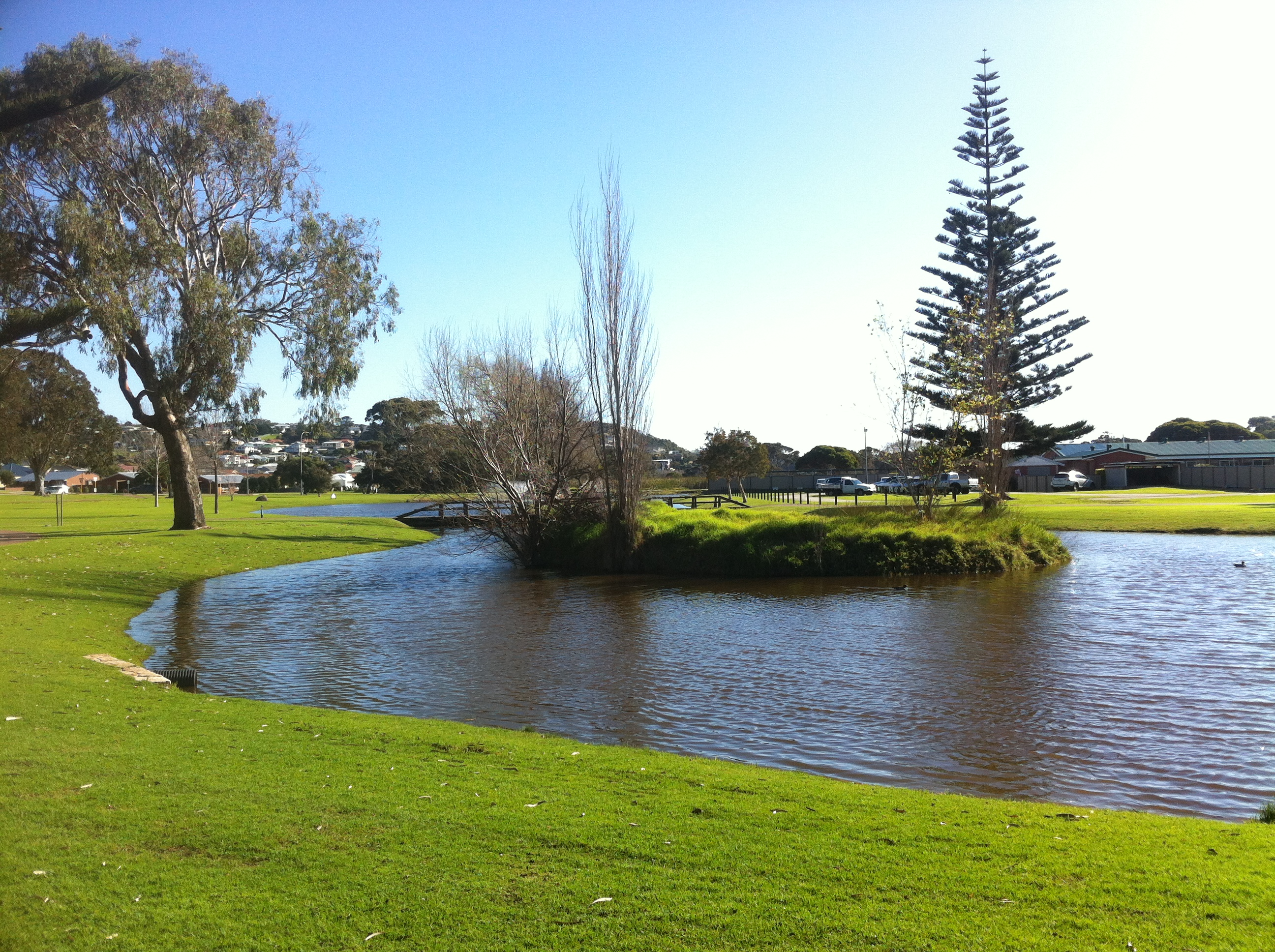
Lake at Eyre Park

The Eyre Park is a park in Middleton Beach in Albany in the Great Southern region of Western Australia.

The park is bounded by Adelaide Crescent, Middleton Road and Garden Street. It has large open spaces, lakes, gazebos, barbeques, public toilets, children's play area and a basketball court.

The park was designed by Harry Baxter of South Perth, who won a competition held by the Albany Municipal Council including a £50 prize. The competition was held in 1946 and Baxter's layout for Eyre Park envisioned most of the area being occupied by an ornamental lake, with provision for gardens and sporting facilities on other portions.

The Middleton Beach Progress Association proposed that tennis courts, a bowling and croquet lawns with pavilion be established on a portion of the park.

By 1948 work was in progress with sandhills being cleared near the beachfront for parking being used to reclaim land at Eyre Park. Bulldozers also continued clearing land within the park.

Play equipment in the park was upgraded in 2016 to include a flying fox, swings, climbing ropes, log rocker, stepping stumps and other items. A bird hide is also planned along the edge of the lake.
