= Premier Hotel, Albany =

Coordinates: 35.0237°S 117.8836°E

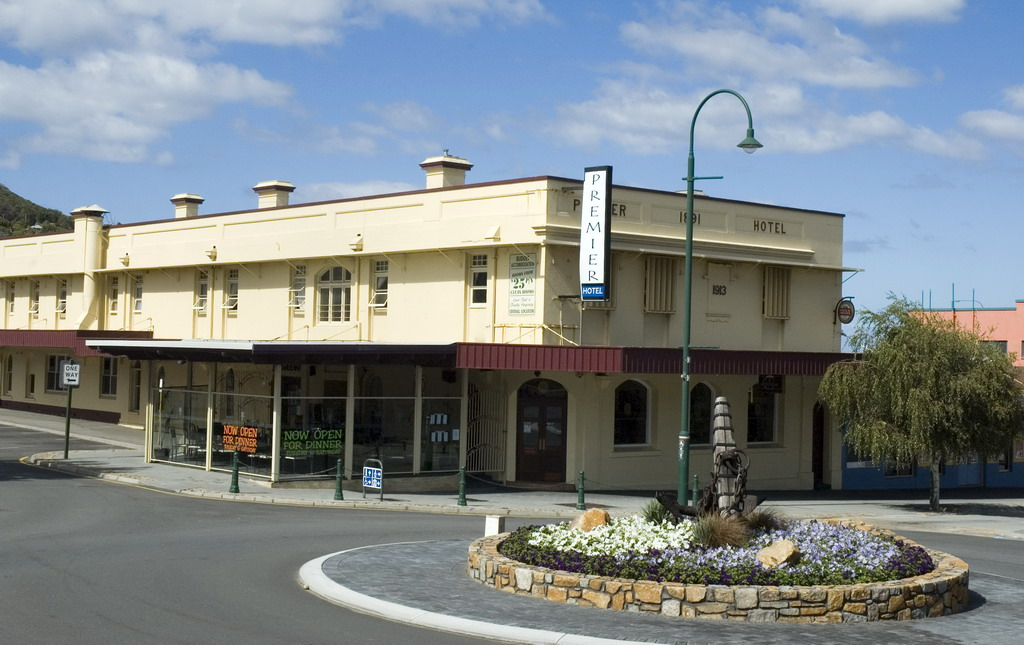
Premier Hotel 2006

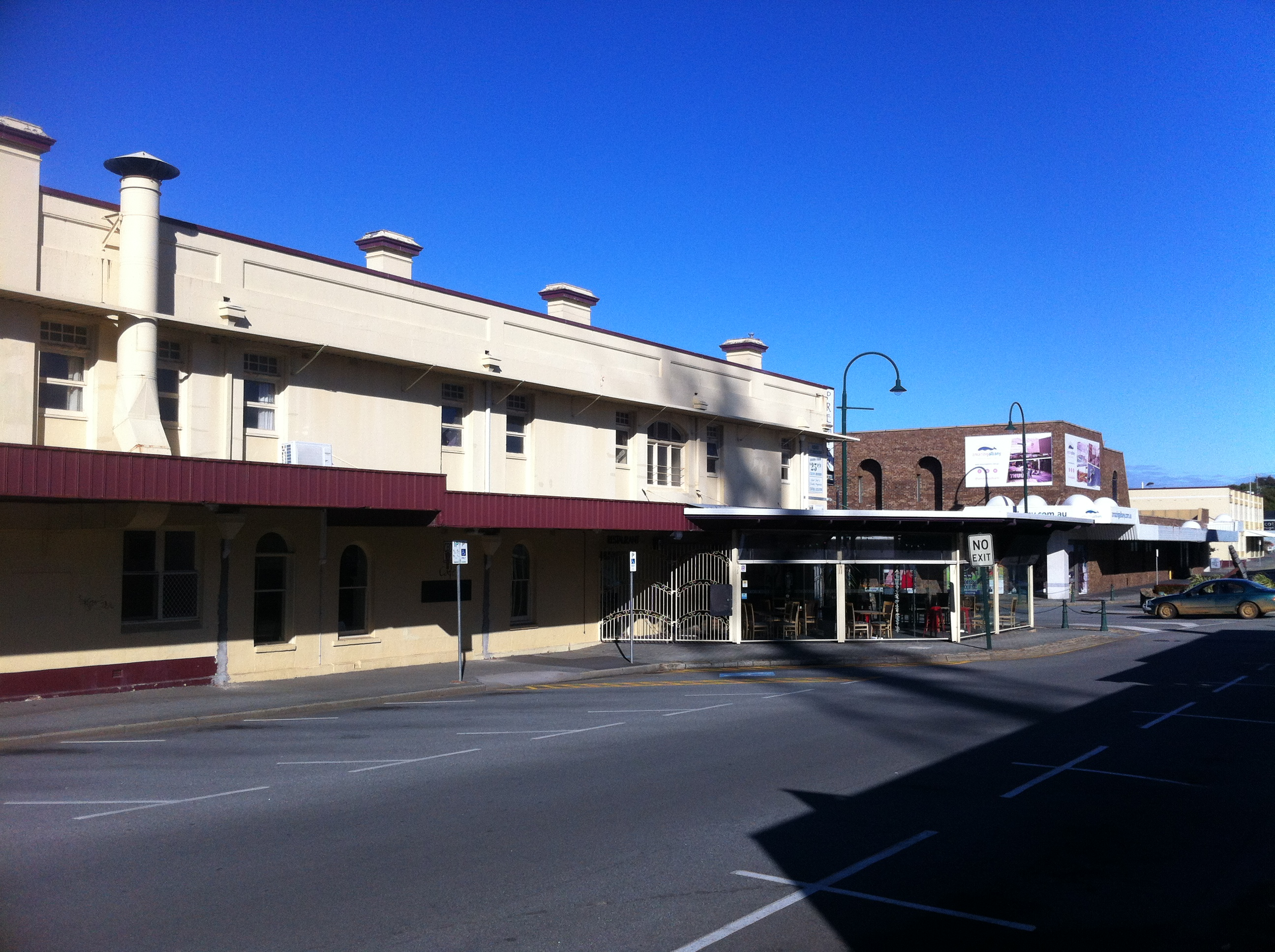
Premier Hotel north facing side in 2016 with smoke damage at far end

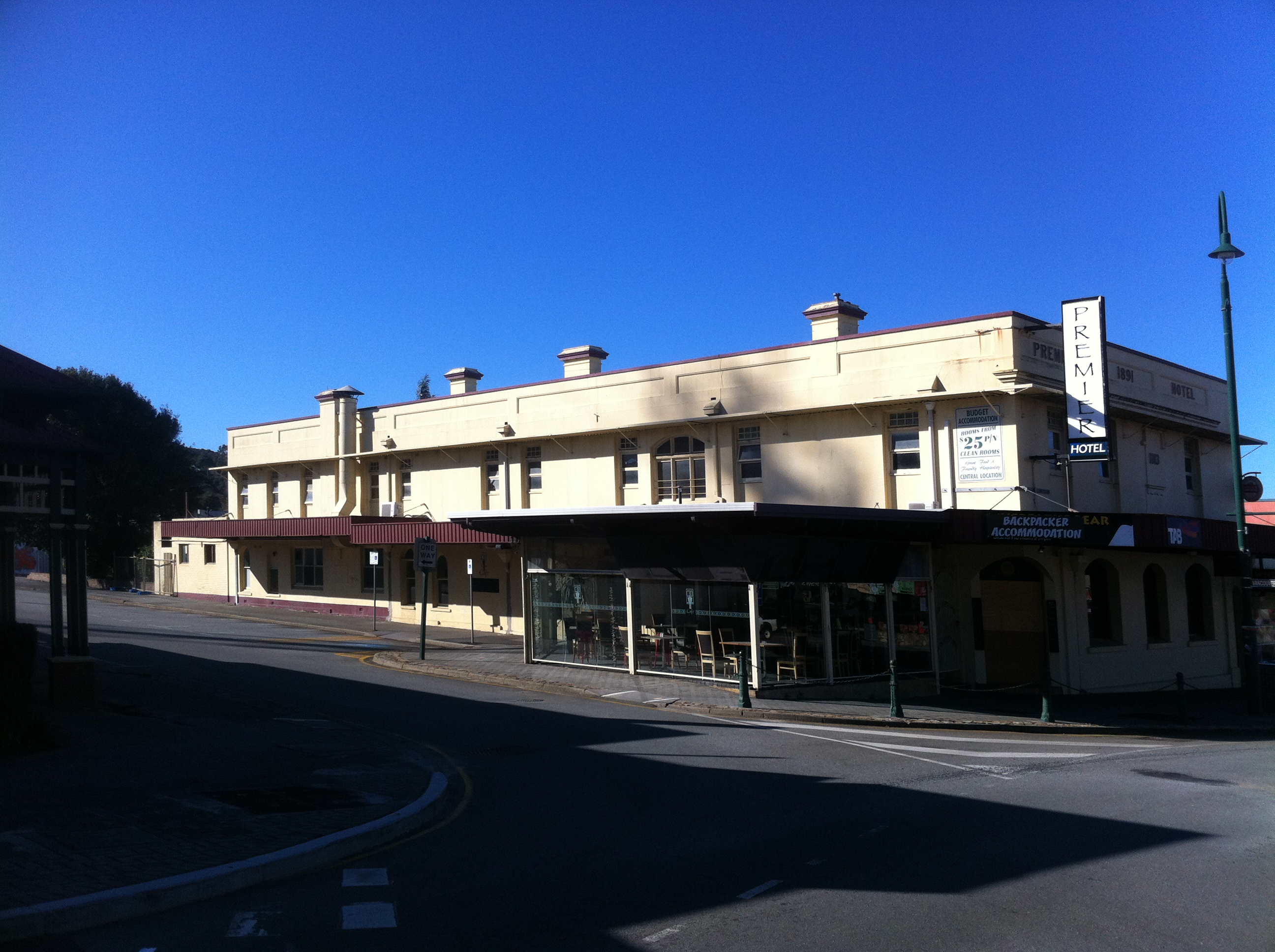
View of Premier Hotel from York Street in 2016 with smoke damage visible

The Premier Hotel is a hotel and a heritage listed building located on the corner of York Street and Grey Street, opposite the Albany Town Hall, in Albany in the Great Southern region of Western Australia.

The two storey building is constructed from brick and has a corrugated iron roof topped with chimneys that have moulded capping. It has arched windows on both levels with a cantilevered canopy over the surrounding pavement.

The hotel was built in 1891 and was the third one built in Albany. Only the Premier and the Albany Hotel still remain. The other, the Railway Hotel, was renamed the Royal George in 1892 and rebuilt in three stories in 1910. The first meeting of the Albany Roads Board was held in the hotel dining room in 1896.

Richard R. Burridge acquired the hotel in 1912 - the licensee was Marcus A. O'Grady.

Following Burridge's death in 1928, the hotel was auctioned in 1929 and acquired by William Harper for £6,550. Harper was the licensee of the Freemason's hotel located on Stirling Terrace. Harper also outbid the then licensee of the Premier Hotel, Alf Martin. At that time the hotel had 20 bedrooms, a sitting and dining room, offices and two large bar areas.

In 1930 the hotel was put on the market again and advertised as having: 26 bedrooms, bars, dining room, commercial rooms, bathrooms, hot water service, and electric light installed and sewered throughout.

W.A. Schurer, who had previously owned the London Hotel, acquired the Premier in 1936 and put it up for sale again in 1950.

The hotel was gutted by fire in 2016. Four occupants were evacuated from the building and the manager was taken to hospital with non-life-threatening injuries. The manager had been assaulted and robbed by two men shortly after midnight. The men lit the fire before leaving the premises. The fire took over four hours to extinguish and gutted most of the interior causing damage in excess of A$1 million. The Licensee was later found to have organised the attack in an attempt to claim a $3M dollar insurance payout.

== See also ==
- List of places on the State Register of Heritage Places in the City of Albany
