= Alexander Collie =

Alexander Collie FRCS
- Born: 2 June 1793; Insch
- Died: 8 November 1835 (aged 42); King George Sound
- Occupations: Surgeon and botanist
- Known for: Journeyed to Western Australia
- Relatives: Alexander and Christina Collie
- Medical career
- Profession: Explorer and Colonial Surgeon

Alexander Collie (2 June 1793 – 8 November 1835) was a Scottish surgeon and botanist who journeyed to Western Australia in 1829, where he was an explorer and Colonial Surgeon.

== Early life ==
Collie was born in Insch in Aberdeenshire, Scotland on 2 June 1793 to Alexander and Christina Collie (née Leslie). The youngest of three sons, Collie studied medicine in Edinburgh before moving to London to further his studies. In January 1813, he joined the Fellowship of the Royal College of Surgeons and became an assistant surgeon in the navy.

== Career ==
He sailed on the frigate Doris to Tenerife, China and the East Indies, before returning to Europe to study botany, mineralogy and chemistry. In 1824 he was a surgeon on board HMS Blossom and travelled to Africa, Brazil, Chile, the Sandwich Islands, California, Kamchatka Peninsula, Taiwan and Mexico.

Collie was ship's surgeon on HMS Sulphur. This was part of the expeditionary group, including the barque Parmelia, which set out from Portsmouth in February 1829 to found the colony of Western Australia. While at sea on 16 April 1829 Collie assisted with the birth of Frederick Henry Stirling, the son of Lieutenant-Governor James Stirling and his wife Ellen.

They arrived at Rottnest Island on 3 June 1829, upon which Collie started working in a hospital tent on Garden Island. He studied botany in his free time. He received 1,500 acres (610 ha) of land on the banks of the Swan River.

He and Lieutenant William Preston explored the southwest of Western Australia, discovering two rivers that Lieutenant-Governor Stirling named after them: Collie River and Preston River. In 1830 he investigated the conditions on the Peel estate. He reported that the estate's manager, Thomas Peel, was incompetent, which led to government assistance for the settlers.

In 1831, Collie was allotted 500 acres (200 ha) of land in Albany, where he was appointed a Justice of the Peace and became the town's first government resident. Suffering from ill health he returned to Perth and was appointed the Swan River Colony's Colonial Surgeon from 1833 to 1835. His decision to return to England was made too late; although he had embarked on HMS Zebra, he died before the ship left Western Australian waters. He died in King George Sound on 8 November 1835 and was buried beside Mokare, his Aboriginal exploring companion.

The graves of both Collie and Mokare were disturbed during the construction of the Albany Town Hall in 1887. Collie's remains were interred at Pioneer Cemetery in Albany.

== Legacy in Australia ==
The town of Collie and Collie River are named in his honour in Western Australia, with a granite monolith erected for him in Collie. The dedication on the monument reads

"To ALEXANDER COLLIE R.N. Physician, Explorer, and Administrator, Who discovered and named the Collie River November 23rd, 1829.

Erected by the Municipal Council of Collie November 23rd, 1935".

Collie Street in Fremantle is also named in his honour.

== Scientific Legacy ==
A Mexican bird species, the black-throated magpie-jay (Calocitta colliei Vigors, 1829), was named after him following his visit to the area on the Blossom in the 1820s.

The Australian turtle species (Chelodina colliei Gray, 1856) is also named in honour of Collie.

Botanists William J. Hooker and G. A. W-Arnott went through his collected plant material back in the UK. The specimens are now stored at Kew Gardens.

== See also ==
- European and American voyages of scientific exploration
