= York Street, Albany =

Street in Albany, Western Australia

York Street, Albany Western Australia
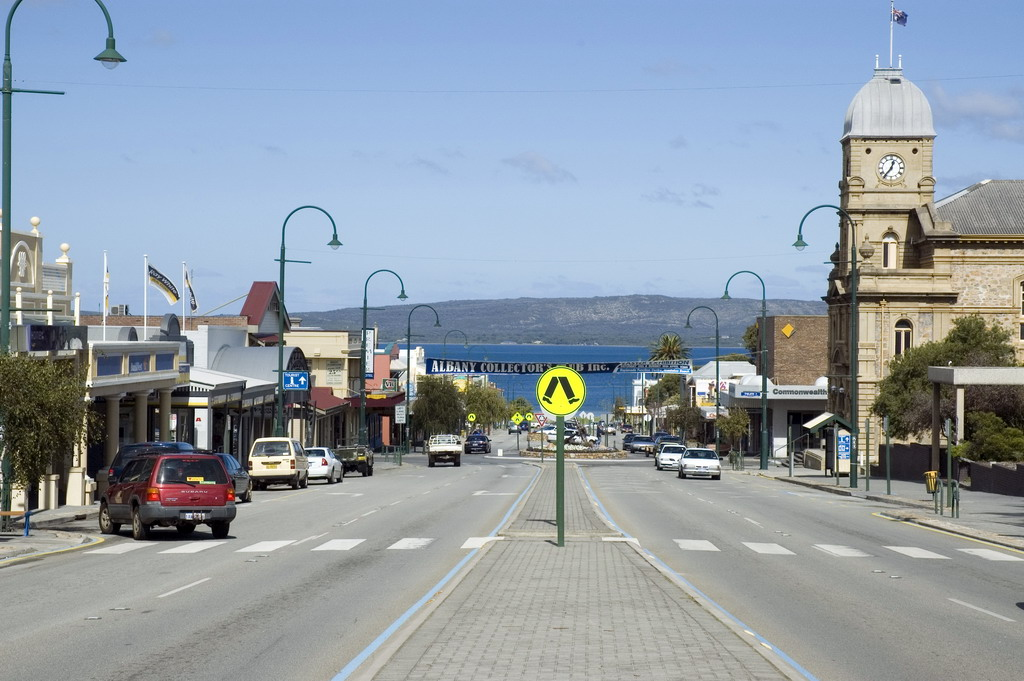
- View looking south along York Street in Albany city centre

General information
- Type: Street
- Length: 850 m (0.5 mi)

Major junctions
- North end: Albany Highway; Lockyer Avenue; St Emilie Way
- Stirling Terrace (Tourist Drive 257)
- South end: Princess Royal Drive

Location(s)
- Major suburbs: Albany

York Street is the main street in the centre of Albany, Western Australia. It runs south from a junction with Albany Highway, Lockyer Avenue and Middleton Road downhill towards Princess Royal Drive and the Anzac Peace Park at the foot of the hill adjacent to Princess Royal Harbour.

As a historic street, with streetscape and precinct into adjoining Stirling Terrace, it has the Albany Town Hall, opened in 1888, and other buildings of significance.

In the 1880s, an issue of the lower portion of the street was over restrictive fencing; the issue was resolved by the construction of a gate.

The Premier Hotel was built opposite the Town Hall in 1891.

Alison Hartman Gardens is situated next to the Town Square along York Street close to the centre of Albany. The park contains numerous sculptures including the statue of Mokare. The Albany Advertiser has its office in lower York Street.

Many photographs have been taken over the last hundred years of the street.

== Major intersections ==
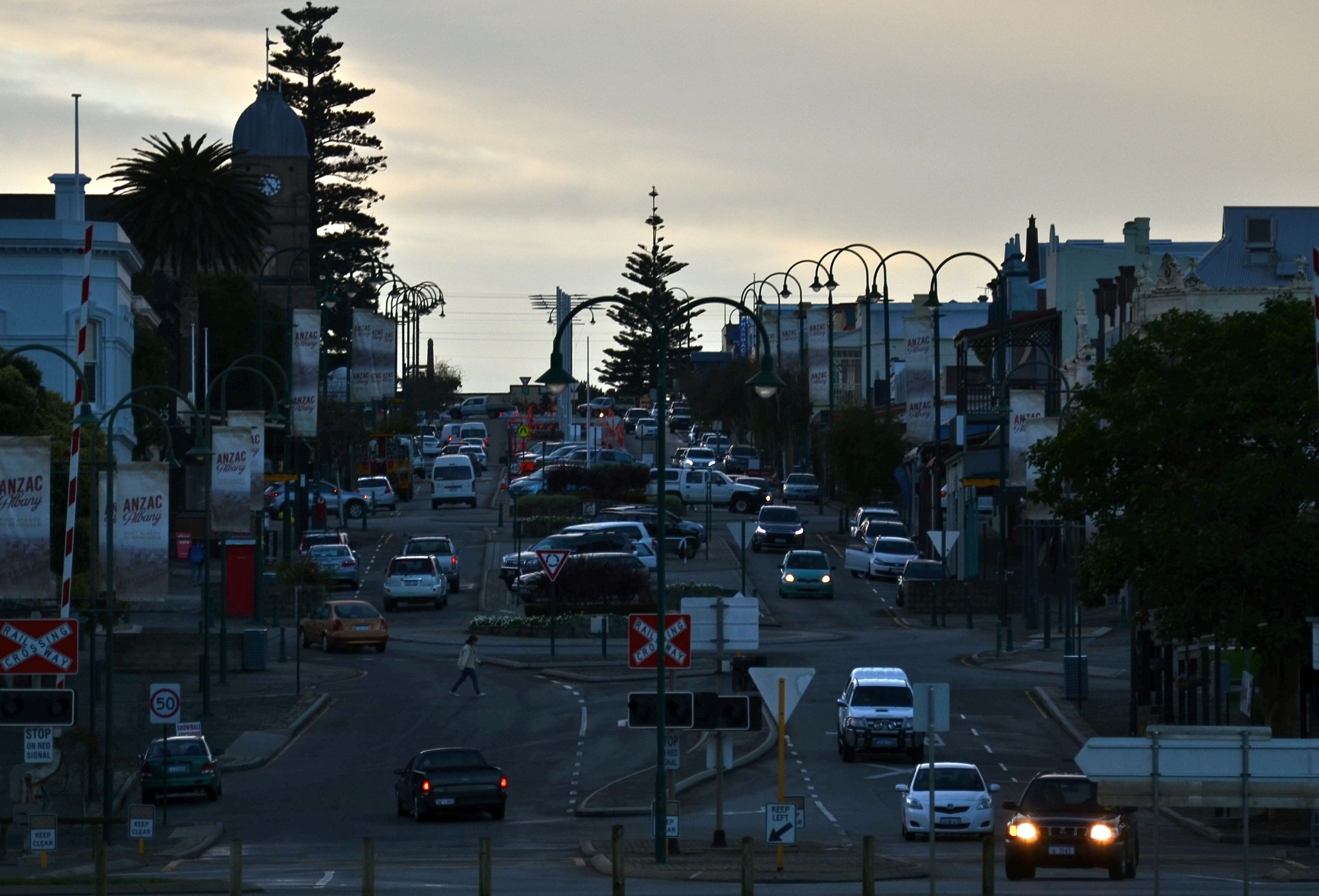
View up York Street at sunset

All intersections listed are controlled by roundabouts unless other indicated.

| LGA | Location | km | mi | Destinations | Notes |
|---|---|---|---|---|---|
| Albany | Albany | 0.0 | 0.0 | Albany Highway west / St Emilie Way east – Mira Mar, Lower King, Mount Melville, Perth | Northern terminus. Continues northwards as Lockyer Avenue. St Emilie Way connects to Middleton Road |
| Albany | Albany | 0.15 | 0.093 | Serpentine Road | |
| Albany | Albany | 0.35 | 0.22 | Grey Street | |
| Albany | Albany | 0.60 | 0.37 | Peels Place | |
| Albany | Albany | 0.70 | 0.43 | Stirling Terrace (Tourist Drive 257) – Mount Clarence | |
| Albany | Albany | 0.85 | 0.53 | Princess Royal Drive – Port Albany, Frenchman Bay | Southern terminus at t-junction |
1.000 mi = 1.609 km; 1.000 km = 0.621 mi
