= Mokare =

Statue of Mokare, Albany, Western Australia

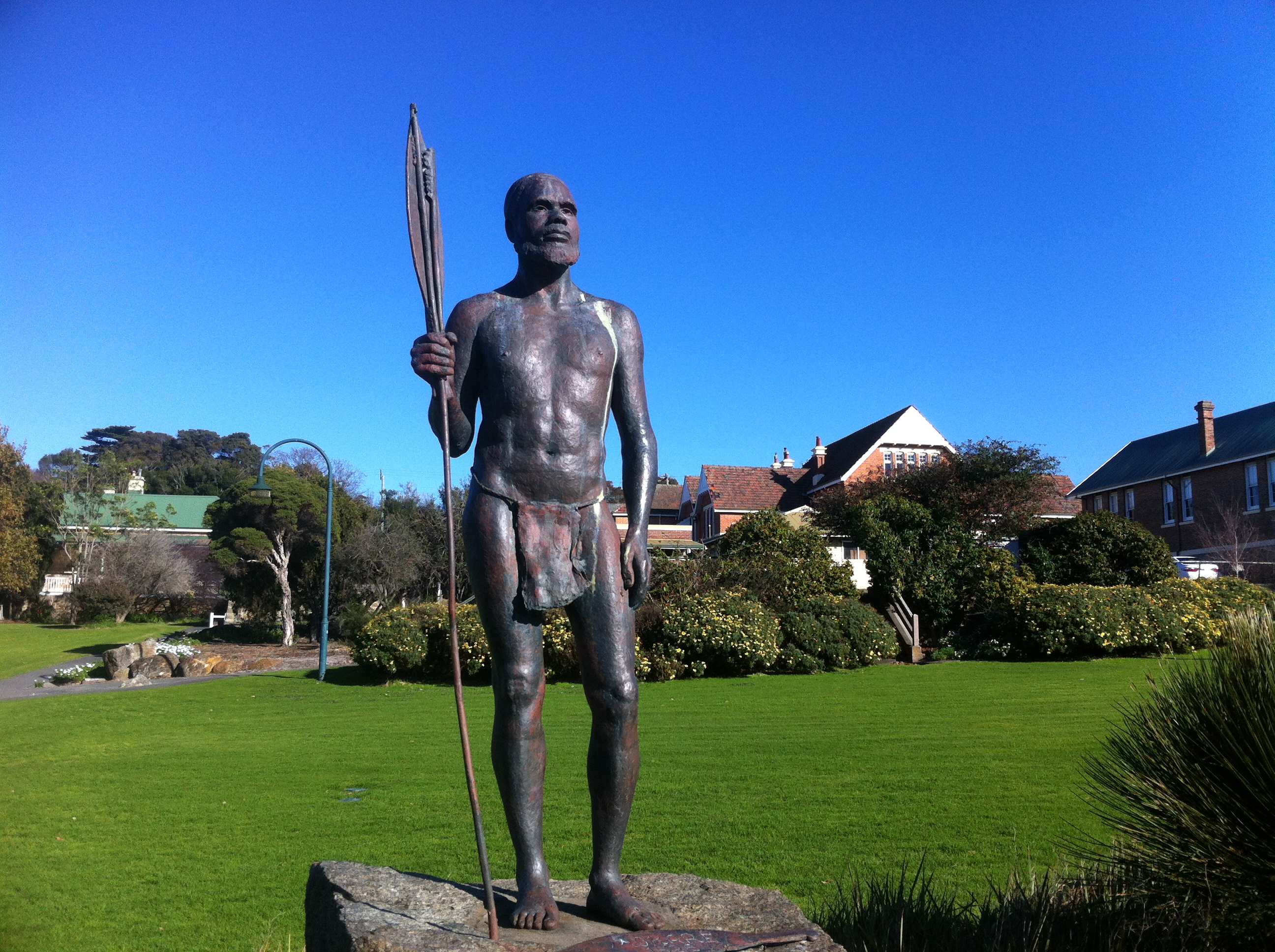
Mokare Statue in Gardens

Mokare (c. 1800 - 26 June 1831) was a Noongar Aboriginal man from the south-west corner of Australia, who was pivotal in aiding European exploration of the area.

== Life ==
Mokare was from the Minang clan of Noongar people. He had at least two brothers: Mollian (d. 1829), who may have been known as Yallapoli, and Nakina, who like Mokare, became a frequent visitor to the settlement at King George Sound (now Albany). He also had a married sister.

Mokare was probably the same man who met Phillip Parker King when his ship stopped at King George Sound in 1821. "Jack", as King called the man, was a charismatic intermediary between the ship's crew and Noongar people who visited the ship.

In 1826 Mokare met the crew of the French barge Astrolabe who passed the area during their voyage to circumnavigate the world.

In 1827 Major Edmund Lockyer arrived at King George Sound in the brig Amity, to found a penal settlement at King George Sound. Mokare showed Lockyer and other Europeans local walking trails that Noongar people had used and maintained over generations. Many of these became key roads still used in the region. Mokare became a close friend of the surgeon-assistant Isaac Scott Nind, who he frequently visited.

In December 1829 Mokare guided Thomas Braidwood Wilson's overland expedition during which Mount Barker and Mount Lindsay were named, as well as Hay River, Denmark River and Wilson Inlet. Two months later he guided Captain Collet Barker's expedition over the same area.

In 1831 Albany formally became part of the Swan River Colony, and Scotsman Alexander Collie became its first government resident. Mokare built a positive relationship with Collie as he had his predecessors. He sometimes lived with Collie in the latter's house.

As there was no competition between the small European population and the local Minang people for land, women or hunting, intercultural relations at Albany were largely peaceful during Mokare's lifetime. Mokare has also become known as a skilled peacemaker and mediator between Aboriginal and white communities. He was concerned when Governor James Stirling began to take command of the King George Sound settlement in 1830, as he had heard of battles and massacres between European settlers and Aboriginal people, and wished it to be maintained as a separate settlement.

== Death and legacy ==
Mokare fell ill and died at Collie's house on 26 June 1831. Collie described his burial, noting that Noongar people and Europeans assembled at the house and walked to a site selected by Nakina, where the Europeans dug a grave and Mokare was interred with a buka cloak and personal artefacts to Nakina's specifications.

When Collie was dying from tuberculosis in 1835, he asked to be buried alongside Mokare. Their graves were together beneath Albany Town Hall. Four years after Mokare's death, the surveyor John Septimus Roe had the graves exhumed. Collie was re-interred at the newly established Albany Cemetery; however it is not known what happened to Mokare's remains.

A park consisting of native bushland on the northern side of Mount Melville in Albany was named after Mokare in 1978. A statue was erected in Alison Hartman Gardens on York Street in the centre of Albany in 1997 as part of a reconciliation project.

== Alternative spellings ==
Mokare's name was also spelt as Mokaré, Mokkare, Mawcarrie, Markew or Makkare.

Dumont d'Urville spells his name "Maukorraï" in the second volume of his Voyage pittoresque autour du Monde.

== Portrait ==
Mokaré's portrait was sketched by Louis-Auguste de Sainson in 1826. It appears in colour with his name on the bottom right-hand corner of plate 8 of Dumont d’Urville, Voyage et découvertes de l’Astrolabe..., Atlas, 1833.
