= Point King Lighthouse =

Lighthouse in Western Australia

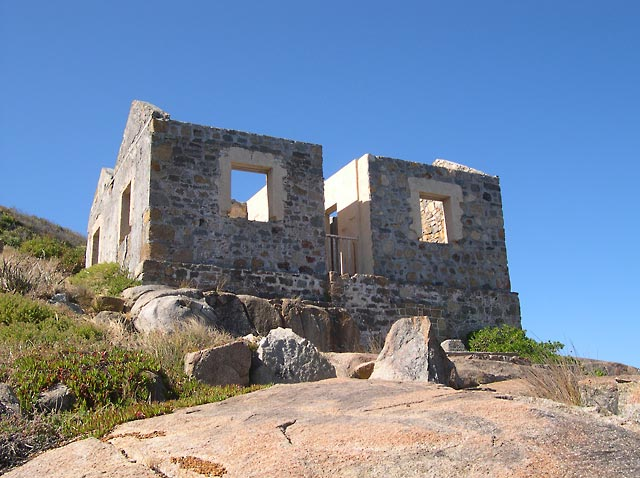
- Location: Princess Royal Harbour, Albany, Western Australia
- Coordinates: 35°02′06.1″S 117°55′05.7″E

Tower
- Constructed: 1858 (first)
- Construction: wooden tower (first) skeletal tower (second) steel (current)
- Automated: 1913
- Height: 9 metres (30 ft)
- Shape: cylindrical tower with balcony and beacon (current)
- Markings: white tower
- Power source: solar power
- Operator: City of Albany
- Heritage: State Registered Place

Light
- First lit: 1911 (second)
- Deactivated: 1911 (first)
- Focal height: 42 metres (138 ft)
- Range: 12 nautical miles (22 km; 14 mi)
- Characteristic: FI W 3s

Western Australia Heritage Register
- Type: State Registered Place
- Designated: 13 December 1996
- Reference no.: 3212

Point King Lighthouse was a lighthouse located on the northern entrance to Princess Royal Harbour in Albany in the Great Southern region of Western Australia.

The lighthouse was the first navigational light for the Port of Albany and the second lighthouse to be built on the West Australian coastline.

== History ==
Following the end of the Crimean War in 1856, a return of the profitable mail boat service from England, via Albany, to the eastern states was anticipated and the need for a lighthouse into the harbour was foreseen.

The British Government proposed to construct two lighthouses in the area in 1857, one on Breaksea Island and the other at Point King, on the understanding that the local government met the running costs. Construction commenced shortly afterward and the prefabricated lights arrived in June; the project was completed later in the year and the lighthouse commenced operating on New Years Day in 1858 with William Hill employed as the light keeper.

The original lighthouse consisted of the keeper's house situated 47 feet (14 m) above the high water mark on the granite point. The building had a 17 feet (5 m) high square wooden tower equipped with an oil-fired light visible from 12 miles (19 km) away. The light was operated manually and the keeper lived in the dwelling where the tower was housed.

The lighthouse was made redundant in June 1911. The building remained unused for many years with the roof and tower lost many years ago. In 1995 a conservation plan was prepared but by 1999 no work had been carried out.

In 2011 the Albany City Council set aside A$20,000 to stabilize the ruins.

== Keepers ==
- Joseph Nelson 1857-1867
- Samuel Mitchell 1867-1903
- John Reddin 1903–1911

== See also ==
- List of lighthouses in Australia
- List of places on the State Register of Heritage Places in the City of Albany

== Gallery ==
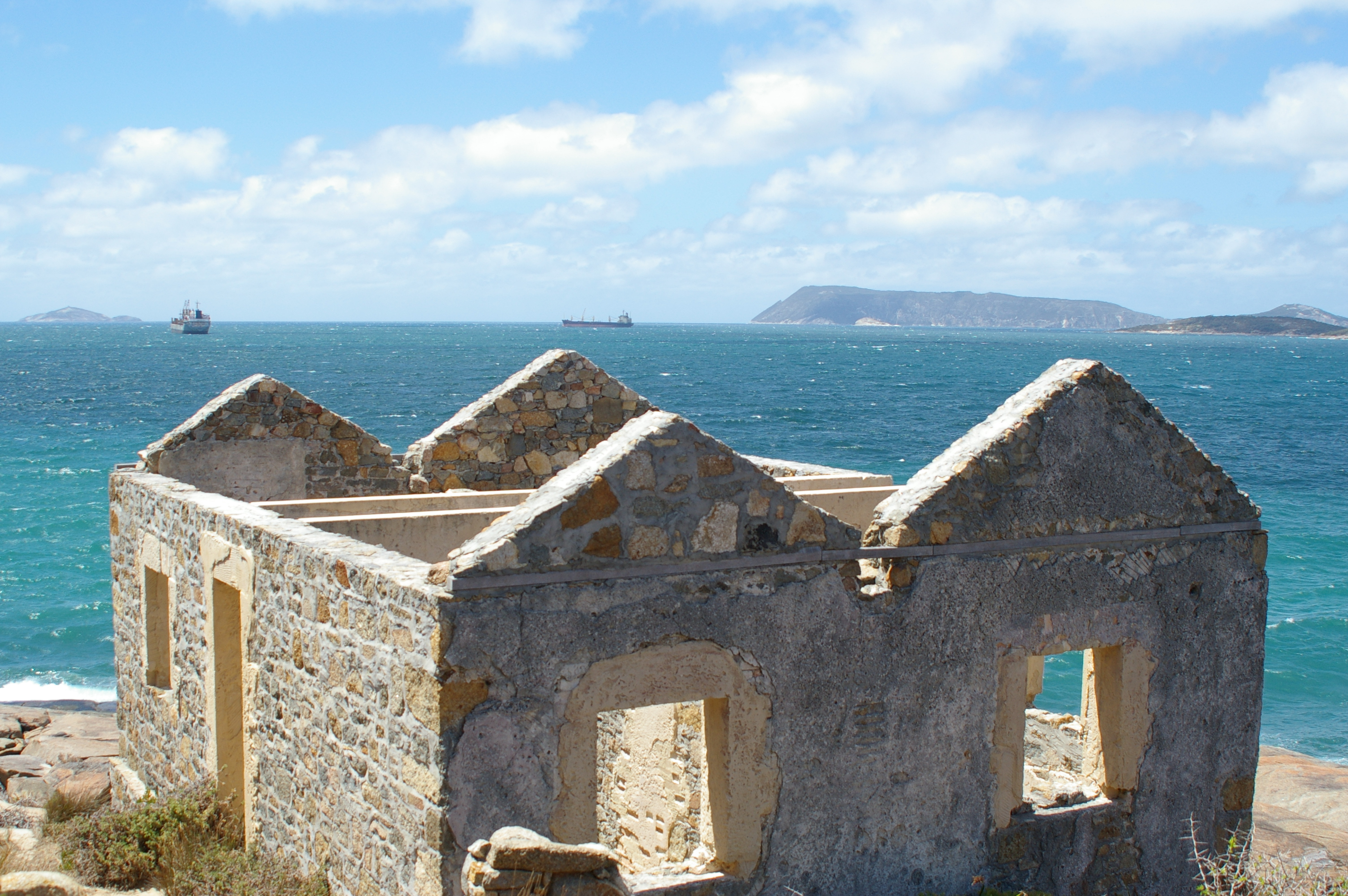
Lighthouse in 2008
