= Alison Hartman Gardens =

Park in Albany, Australia

Coordinates: 35.02271°S 117.8829°E

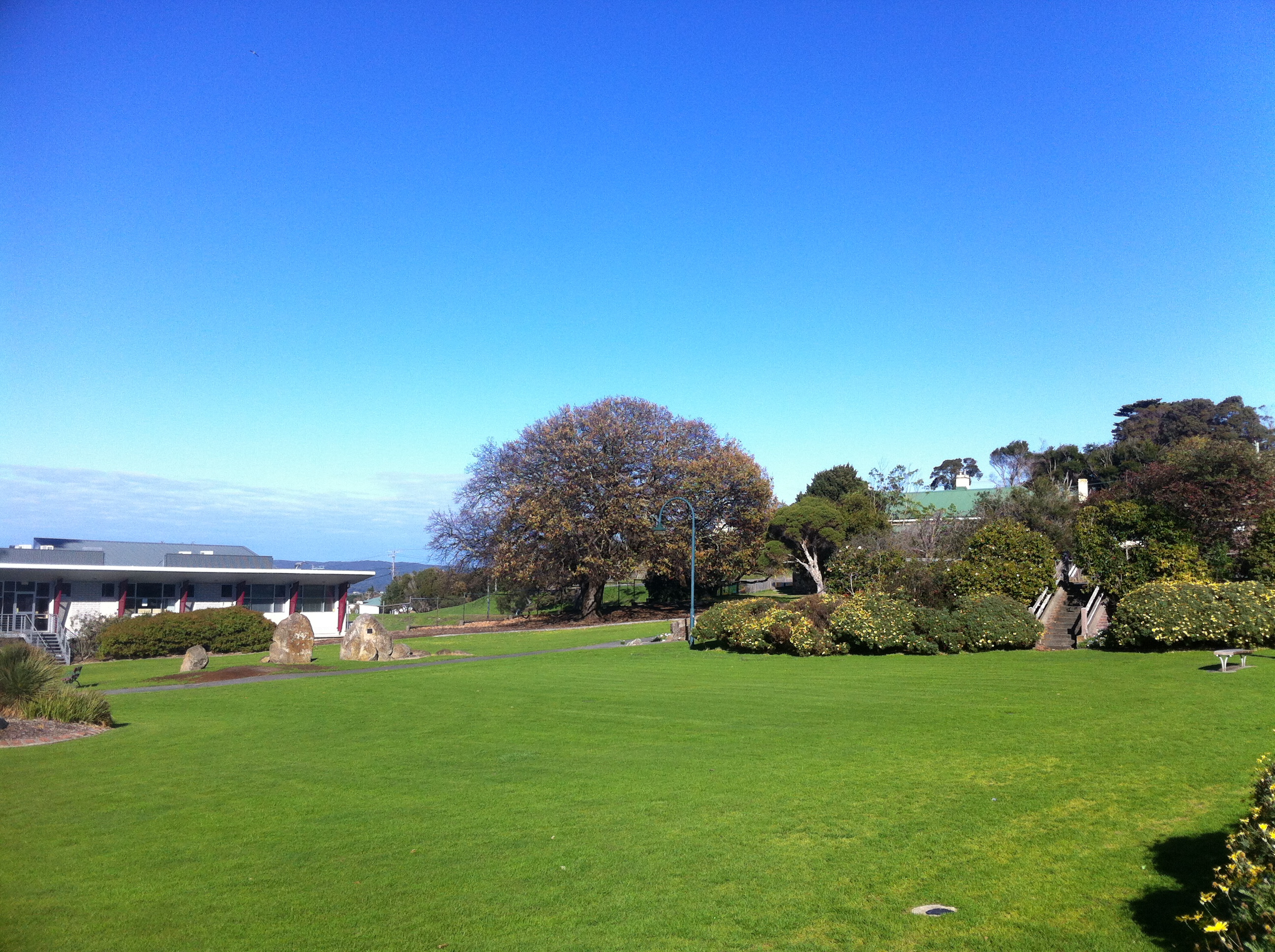
Alison Hartman Garden looking south west

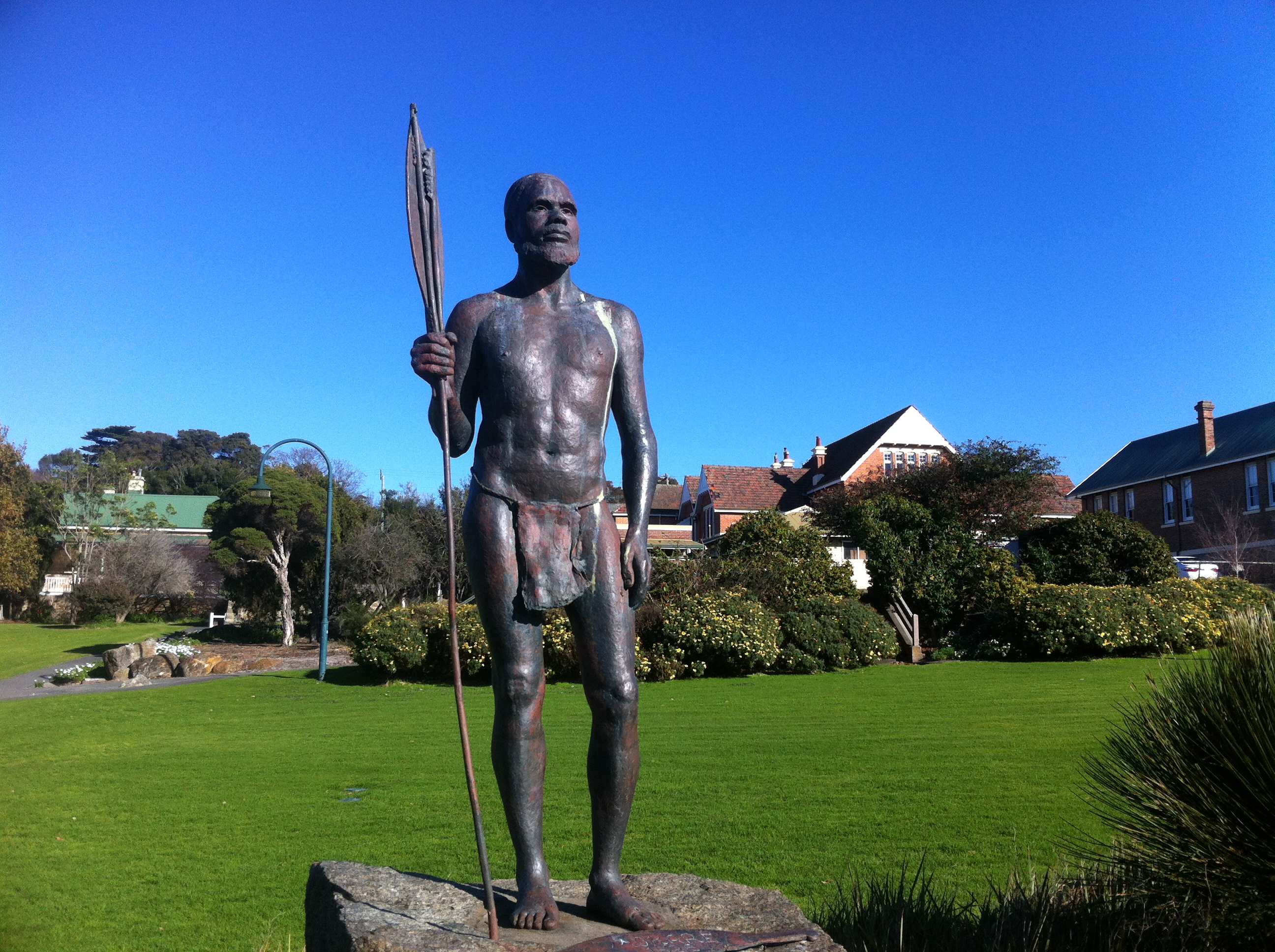
Mokare Statue in Gardens

Alison Hartman Garden, often referred to as Mokare Park, is a park on York Street in Albany in the Great Southern region of Western Australia.

The park, located near the centre of Albany, contains numerous sculptures including the statue of Mokare.

The area is situated adjacent to the Albany Public Library and the Albany Town Square. It often hosts local markets. The area was once the vegetable gardens behind the old state school, which is now the Albany District Education Centre. The gardens are named after a long-serving teacher at Albany State School, Alison Edith Hartman (1906-1978). She was the daughter of John Hartman, who built Albany War Memorial, and she was the Principal of Albany Primary School from 1935 to 1967.

The gardens contain two large Norfolk Island pine trees and a Quercus robur tree that date back to the 1890s along the southern edge. The pines are decorated every Christmas season. The statue of Mokare was erected in 1977 as a memorial to the Noongar man who helped the early settlers maintain a peaceful coexistence with the traditional owners. A series of community sculptures were set around a granite outcrop in the gardens in 1989. These include large, century-old timbers are from the original own Jetty that symbolise Jetty, ships loading cranes and other agricultural machinery to acknowledge the importance of shipping and agriculture in the early development of the town. A Peace Pole, featuring the message May Peace prevail on Earth, at the rear of the gardens was erected in 2011 as part of the Harmony Day celebrations.

== See also ==
- List of places on the State Register of Heritage Places in the City of Albany
