= Albany Town Hall (Western Australia) =

Town hall in Albany, Western Australia

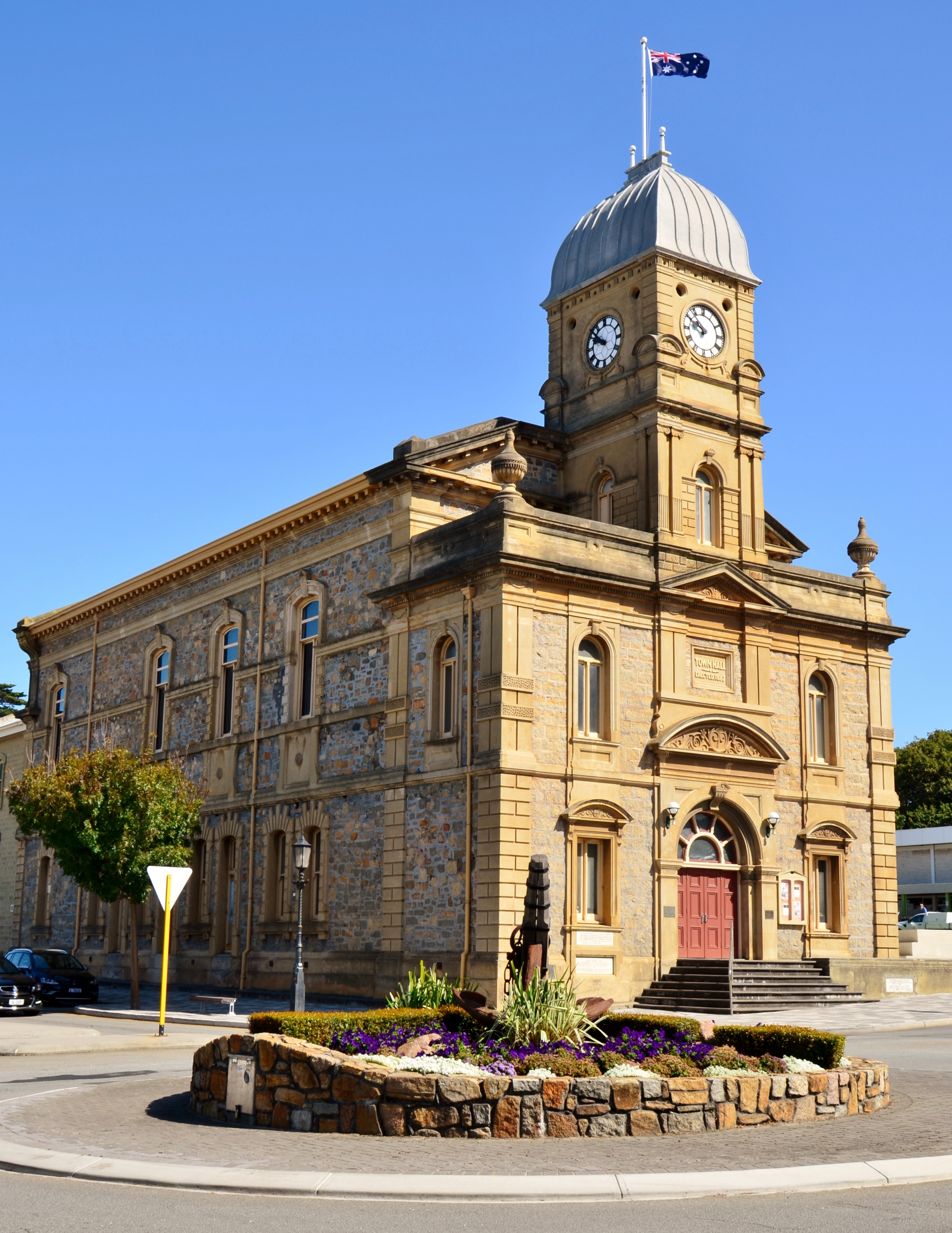
- Albany Town Hall facing York Street
- Interactive map of the Albany Town Hall area

General information
- Type: Town hall
- Location: Albany, Western Australia
- Coordinates: 35°01′24.3″S 117°52′59.4″E

Western Australia Heritage Register
- Type: State Registered Place
- Designated: 29 November 1996
- Reference no.: 74

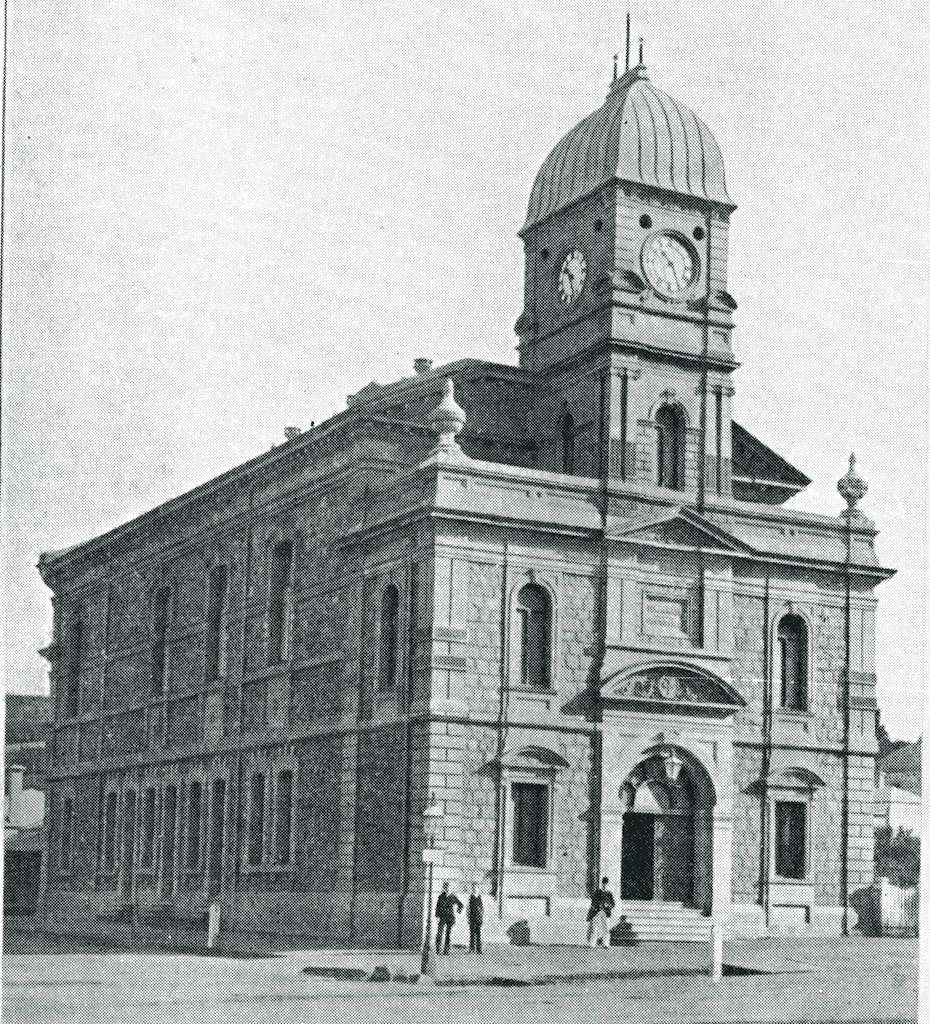
Albany Town Hall approx 1910

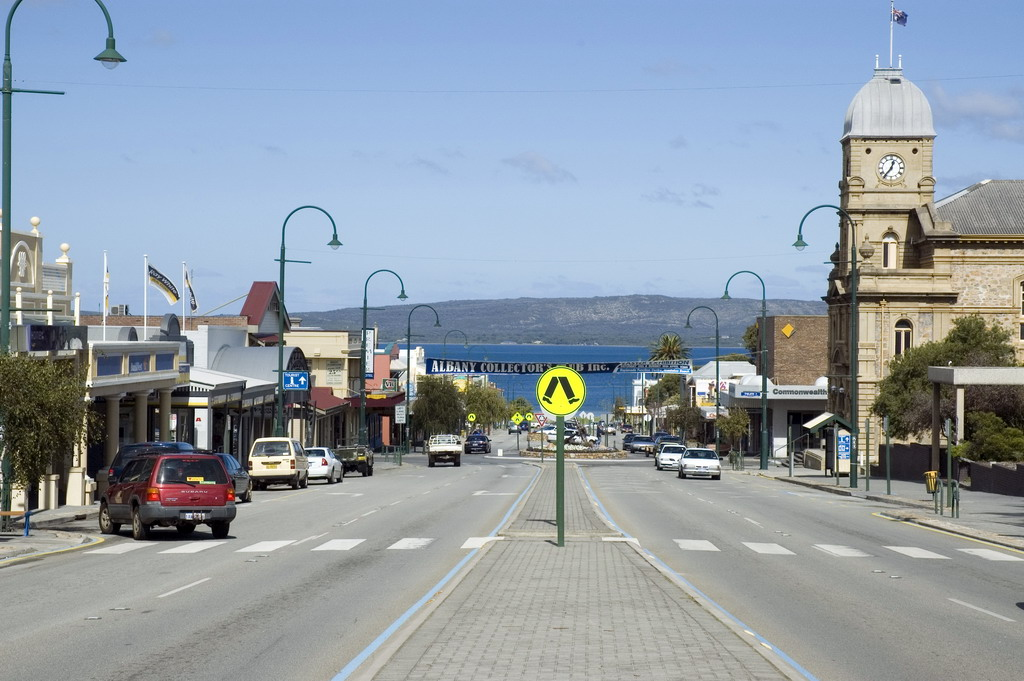
York Street, with town hall on the right

Albany Town Hall is a public building on York Street in Albany in the Great Southern region of Western Australia. It was the first civic building constructed in the town.

== Description ==
The town hall is a two storied building with a stone exterior and four-faced clock tower. It is situated on the corner of Grey Street West and York Street in the centre of Albany. The hall has gallery space on the lower floor with a 310-seat theatre on the upper floor. The building is an example of Victorian Free Classical architecture and was designed by an Adelaide firm, Henderson, Marriot and Company, in 1886.

It is constructed from locally quarried granite masonry and finished with stucco ornamentation externally and plastered brickwork internally. The hall has a ground floor, first floor and gallery level along with other levels within the clock tower. The building has a rectangular footprint with the clock tower centrally located on the front facade, which dominates the streetscape. The tower is topped with a copper roof and a flagpole.

Originally the building housed municipal and commercial offices on the ground floor with the public hall on the first floor. The hall provided a venue for cultural and community events such as theatre, cinema, meetings and dances.

== History ==
Planning for the building commenced in late 1882 when a meeting of the Albany Municipal Council adopted a works programme for the following year, provided that a loan of £6,000 was procured. The works included a Town Hall with Municipal Offices, for which £2,000 was set aside. The Governor, William Robinson offered the council land to the value of £500 to be sold to pay for a suitable piece of land of their choice. A block at the current site on York Street was chosen and then acquired.

In 1884 plans for the building had been completed and tenders for construction had been issued.

The graves of both Alexander Collie and Mokare were disturbed during the construction of the town hall. Collie's remains were later interred at Pioneer Cemetery in Albany.

The foundation stone for the hall was laid in December 1886 by the wife of the Mayor, Mrs W. G. Knight. A large crowd was in attendance, including the architects, Messrs Henderson and Marriot, and the builders, Messrs. Harmon and Hamilton. The clerk of works was John Phillimore.

The town hall was opened by the Mayor, William Grills Knight, on Foundation Day in 1888. A planned procession up Yorke Street was cancelled due to bad weather so the keys were presented to the Mayor on the steps. A banquet for 60 was then held in the hall, followed by a grand ball for 250 later that evening. Electrical lighting was installed into the hall the following year.

The town hall clock, manufactured by Potts of Leeds, was not started until April 1891.

Toward the end of 1899 a series of important town meetings were held in the hall to discuss whether Albany should separate from the colony of Western Australia and join in a federation with the other Australian colonies. This came about because Albany residents had long nursed grievances against Sir John Forrest's State Government, particularly the development of Fremantle as the colony's main port.

In 1911 the building's first floor level was routinely being used as a picture theatre, new escape stairs were built on the northern side of the building in 1912 and the upper gallery was added in 1913 to increase seating.

New municipal offices for the City of Albany were built in 1967 and the hall was used primarily as a theatre and for hosting community events.

The building was classified by the National Trust in 1977 and placed on the Register of the National Estate in 1978.

By 1981 work commenced to convert the building into a theatre; it was completed by 1986. A concrete block extension was also added to the rear of the building at this time, obscuring the original stone work. The clock-face was also repaired as part of the renovations, with a bullet hole, which had appeared when troops returned home from the Boer War, patched and painted. An unnamed soldier had taken the shot from the bottom of York Street on the waterfront with a Martini–Henry rifle.

The building was listed on the State Register of Heritage Places in 1996.

The town square adjacent to the Town Hall was redeveloped in 2014 in time for events to commemorate the centenary of the departure of ANZAC troops.

In 2021, it reopened following a $3.7 million refurbishment to adapt the building for use as a multi-purpose arts venue, which included remodelling the upper-floor auditorium and removing tiered seating installed in the 1980s.

== See also ==
List of places on the State Register of Heritage Places in the City of Albany

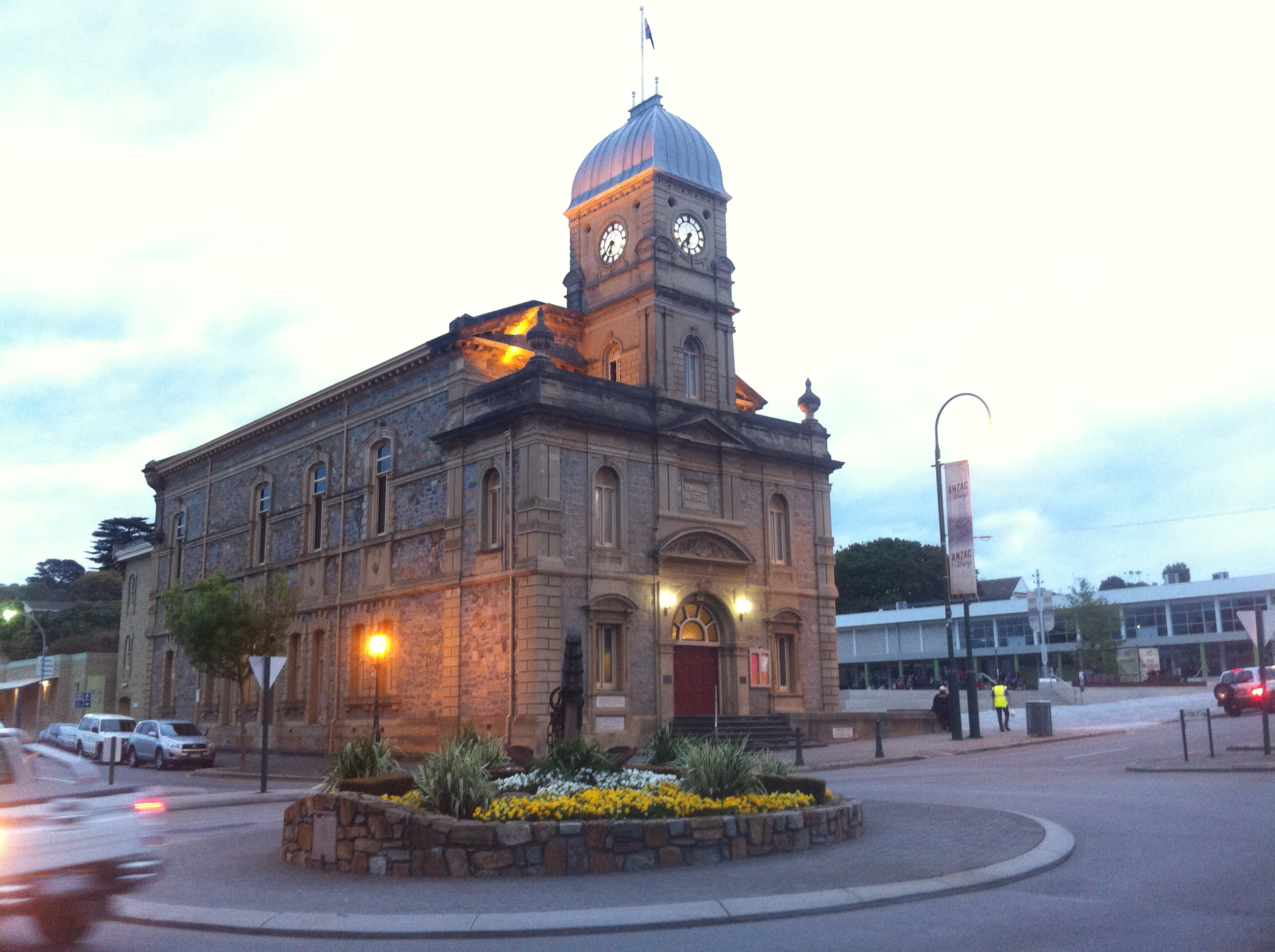
Albany Town Hall dusk in 2014

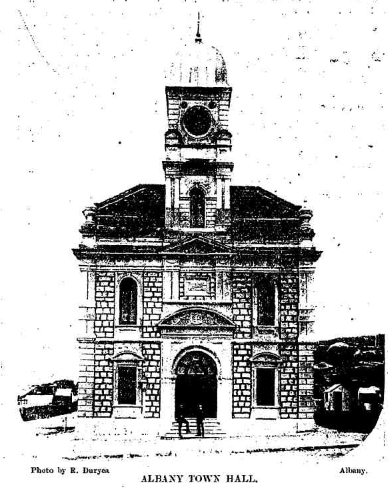
Albany Town Hall 1897

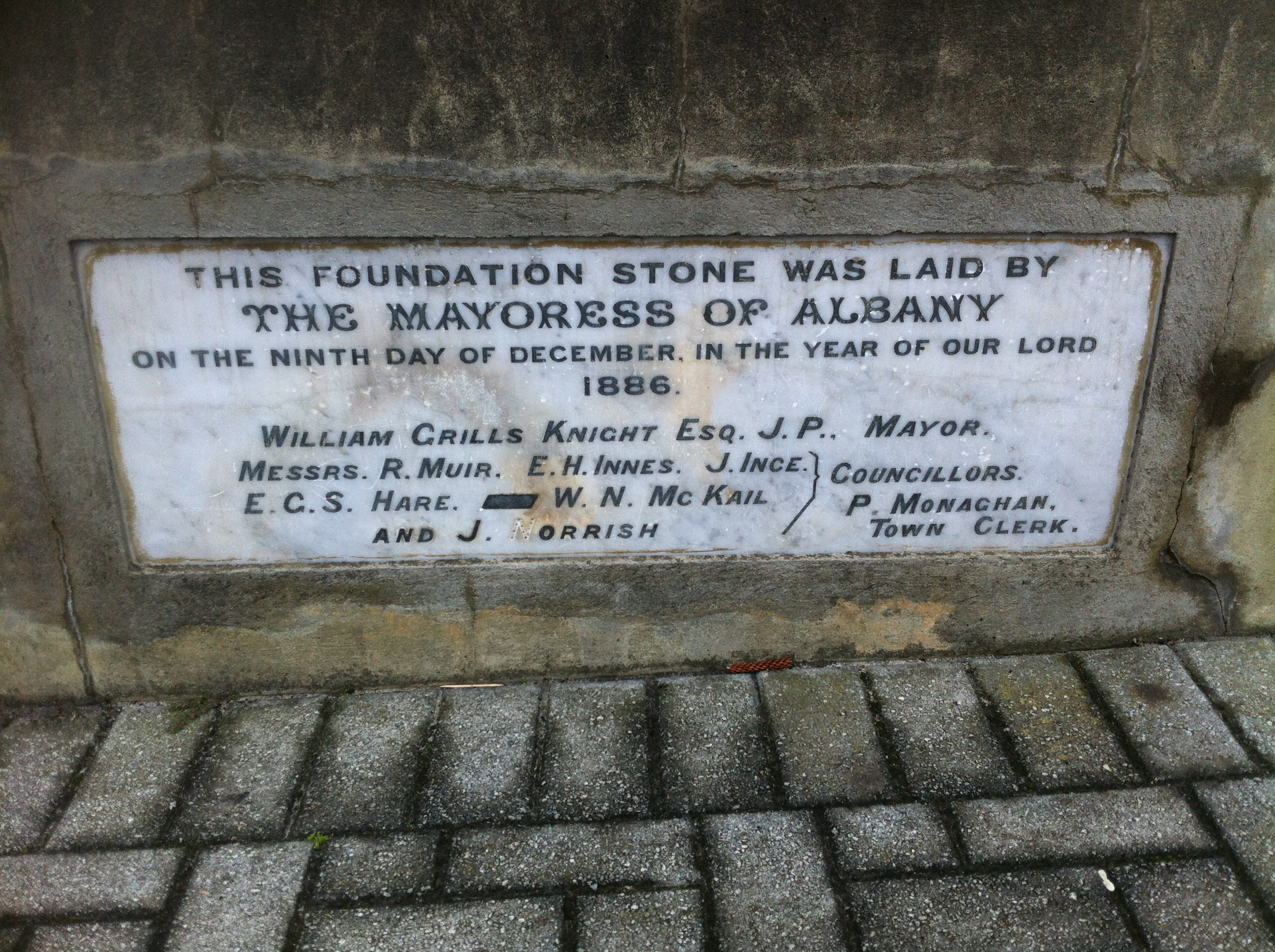
Albany Town Hall foundation stone

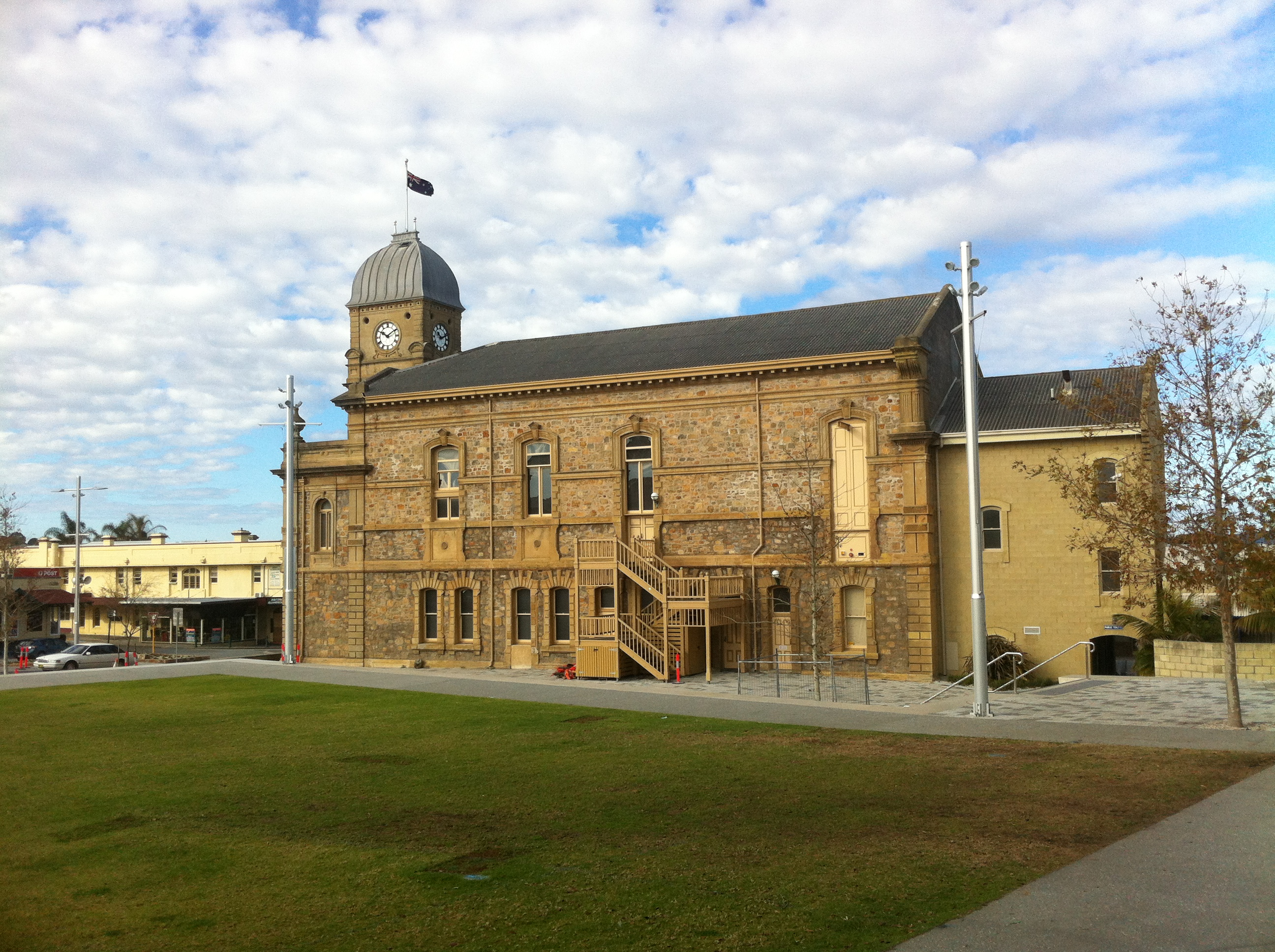
Albany Town Hall from square
