= Middleton Road, Albany =

Road in Albany, Western Australia

Middleton Road is a significant arterial road in Albany, Western Australia.

From a junction with York Street and Albany Highway it runs to the north of Mount Clarence to the location of Middleton Beach and to the beach itself and Ellen Cove.

It also passes Dog Rock.

The role as an arterial road to the beach resort of Middleton Beach has seen a range of issues arising – speed and condition.

Early stages of bituminization occurred in 1926.
