= HMS Doris =

Four ships of the Royal Navy have been named HMS Doris after the mythical Greek sea nymph Doris, whilst another was planned:

- HMS Doris (1795) was a 36-gun fifth-rate frigate launched in 1795 and wrecked in 1805.
- HMS Doris was to have been a 32-gun Narcissus-class fifth-rate frigate. She was ordered in 1806 but was cancelled later that year.
- HMS Doris (1808) was a 36-gun fifth-rate frigate built for the navy at the East India Company Dockyard in Bombay and launched in 1807 as Salsette, but renamed Pitt later that year. She was then renamed HMS Doris. She was sold in 1829.
- HMS Doris (1857) was a wood screw frigate launched in 1857 and sold in 1885.
- HMS Doris (1896) was an Eclipse-class light cruiser launched in 1896 and sold in 1919.
- HMS Doris (1904) was a three-master schooner, launched in 1904 sunk in 1907 before the coast of Westkapelle, Netherlands
