= ANZAC Peace Park =

Park in Australia

Coordinates: 35.028564°S 117.883767°E

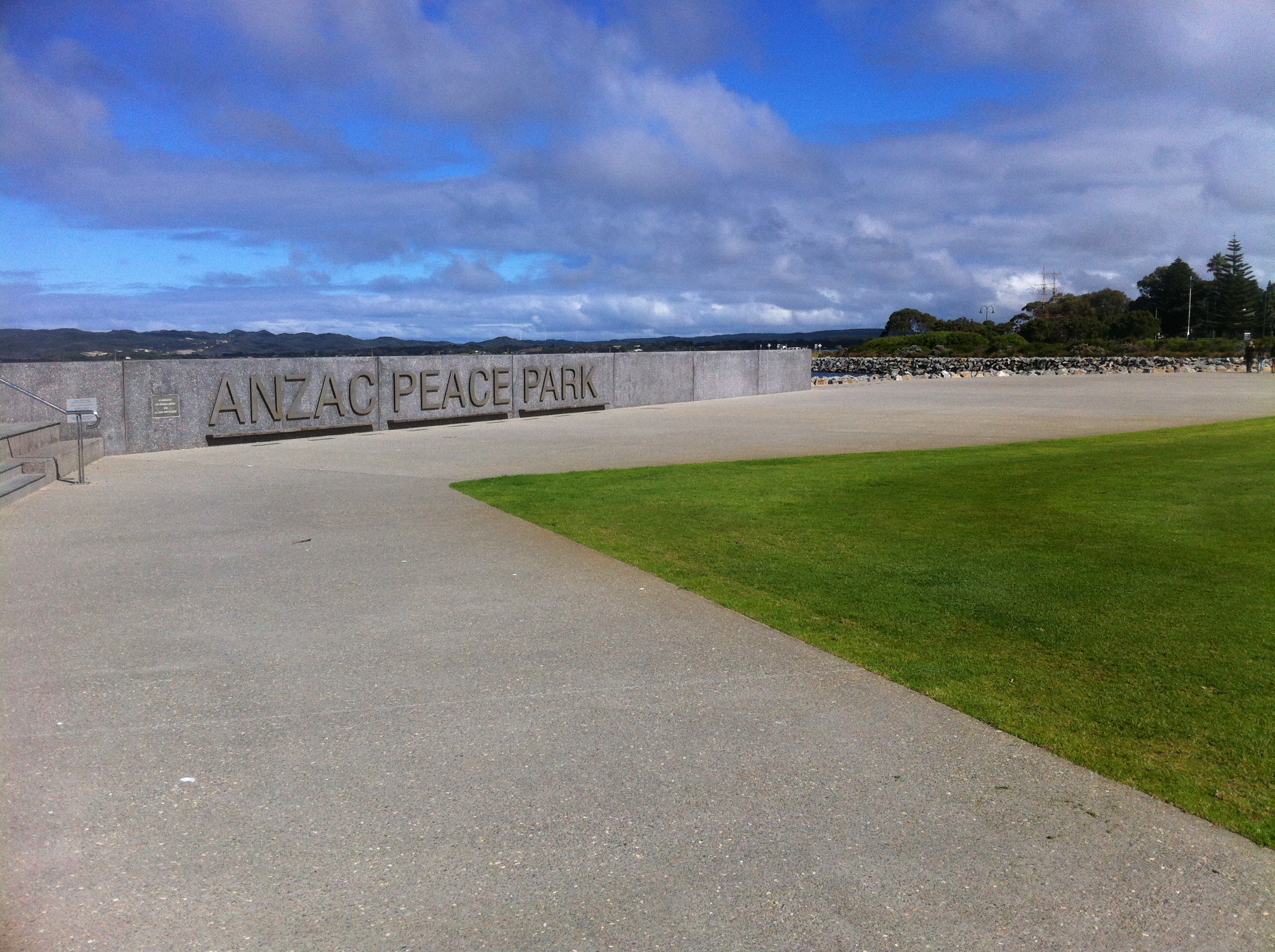
Memorial Wall

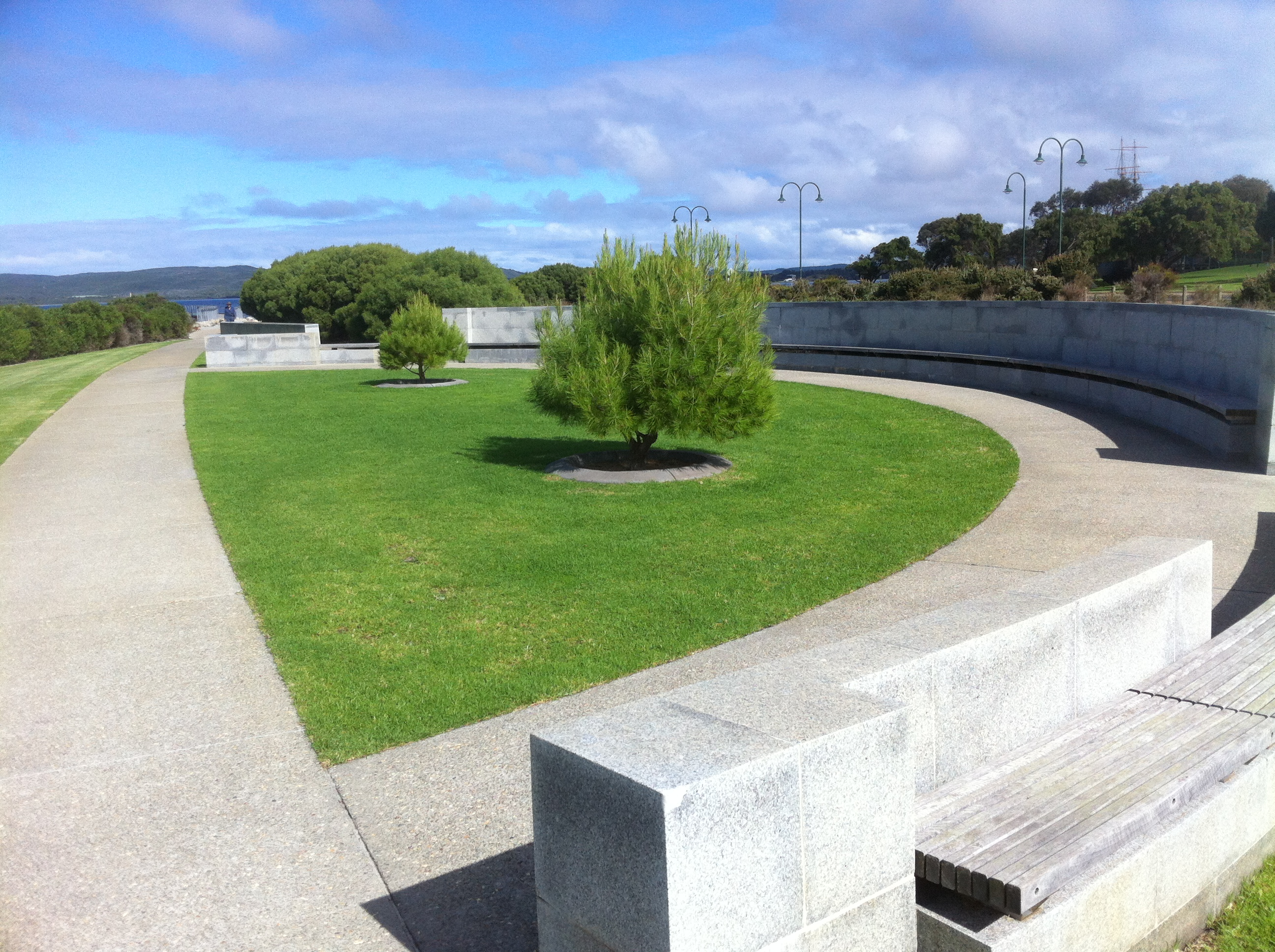
Lone Pine Grove

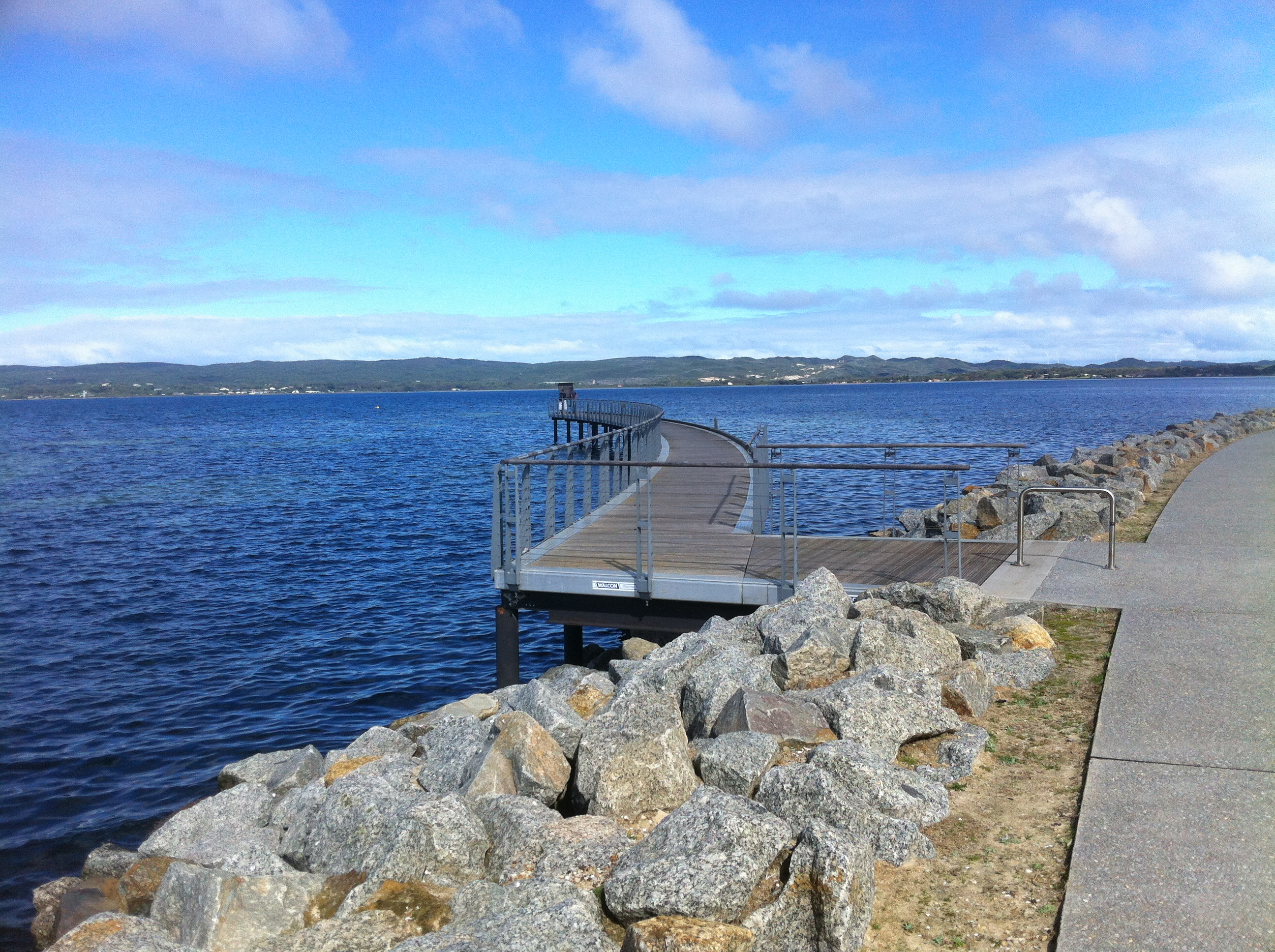
Pier of Remembrance out into Princess Royal Harbour

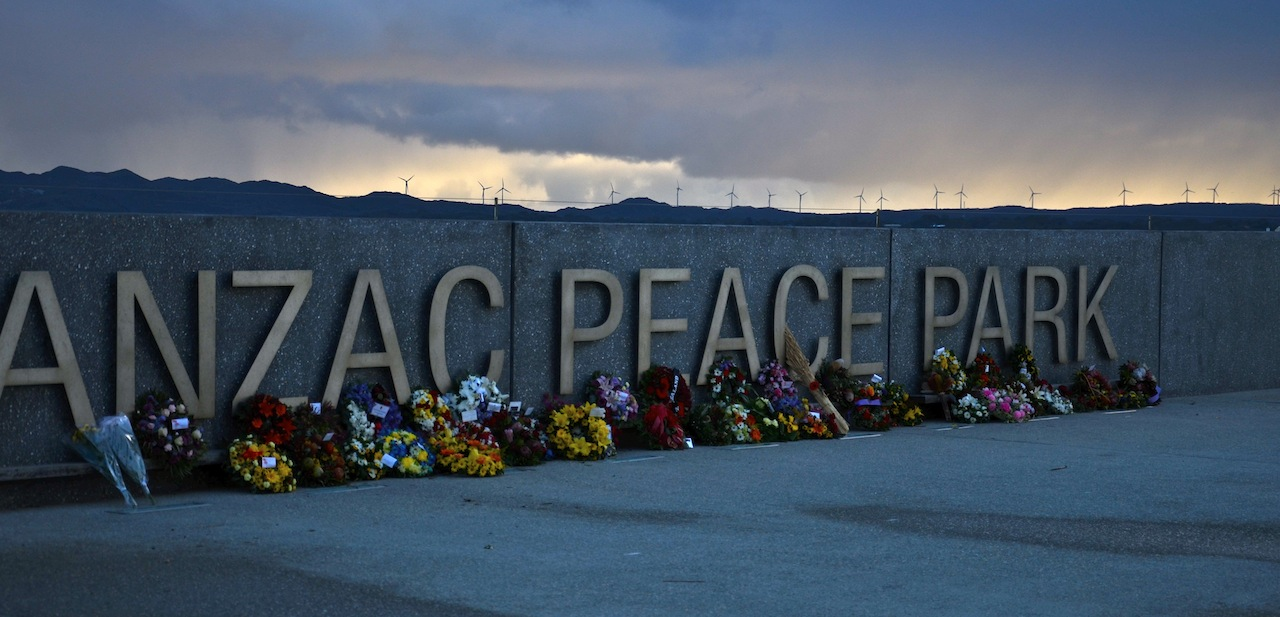
Wreaths from Anzac Day 2016

ANZAC Peace Park is a park in Albany in the Great Southern region of Western Australia. It is located at the foot of the hill where York Street meets Princess Royal Drive.

The park opened in 2010, and it is designated to commemorate the departure to the war front of soldiers who served in the Australian and New Zealand Army Corps (ANZAC) during World War I.

== Features ==
Features found within the park include: a memorial wall, pier of remembrance, interpretive signage, lighting, landscaping, pathways and seating. A small area of garden named Lone Pine Grove has been planted with Aleppo pines, the same tree as found on Lone Pine ridge in Gallipoli providing a living connection between Albany and Gallpoli. Situated adjacent to Princess Royal Harbour at the bottom of York Street, the park is an open area containing the various features to commemorate the departure of soldiers who fought in World War I.

In 2014, the park was the focal point of the centenary of the departure of the ANZAC troops for World War I. For many of the troops Albany was the last they saw of their homeland. A commemorative service was held in the park, attended by 60,000 people with dignitaries such as the Australian Prime Minister, Tony Abbott, and the New Zealand Prime Minister, John Key, who both gave addresses as part of the ceremony.

== History and creation ==
The park was officially opened in 2010 and hosted its first Anzac Day later the same year.

The Peace Park is part of the A$110 million Albany Waterfront Development managed by LandCorp that also included the Albany Entertainment Centre and marina. The Western Australian Premier, Colin Barnett, announced in 2009 that the state government would provide A$433,000 funding for the Peace Park. The total cost of the park was A$4.5 million.
