= Port of Albany =

Port in Western Australia

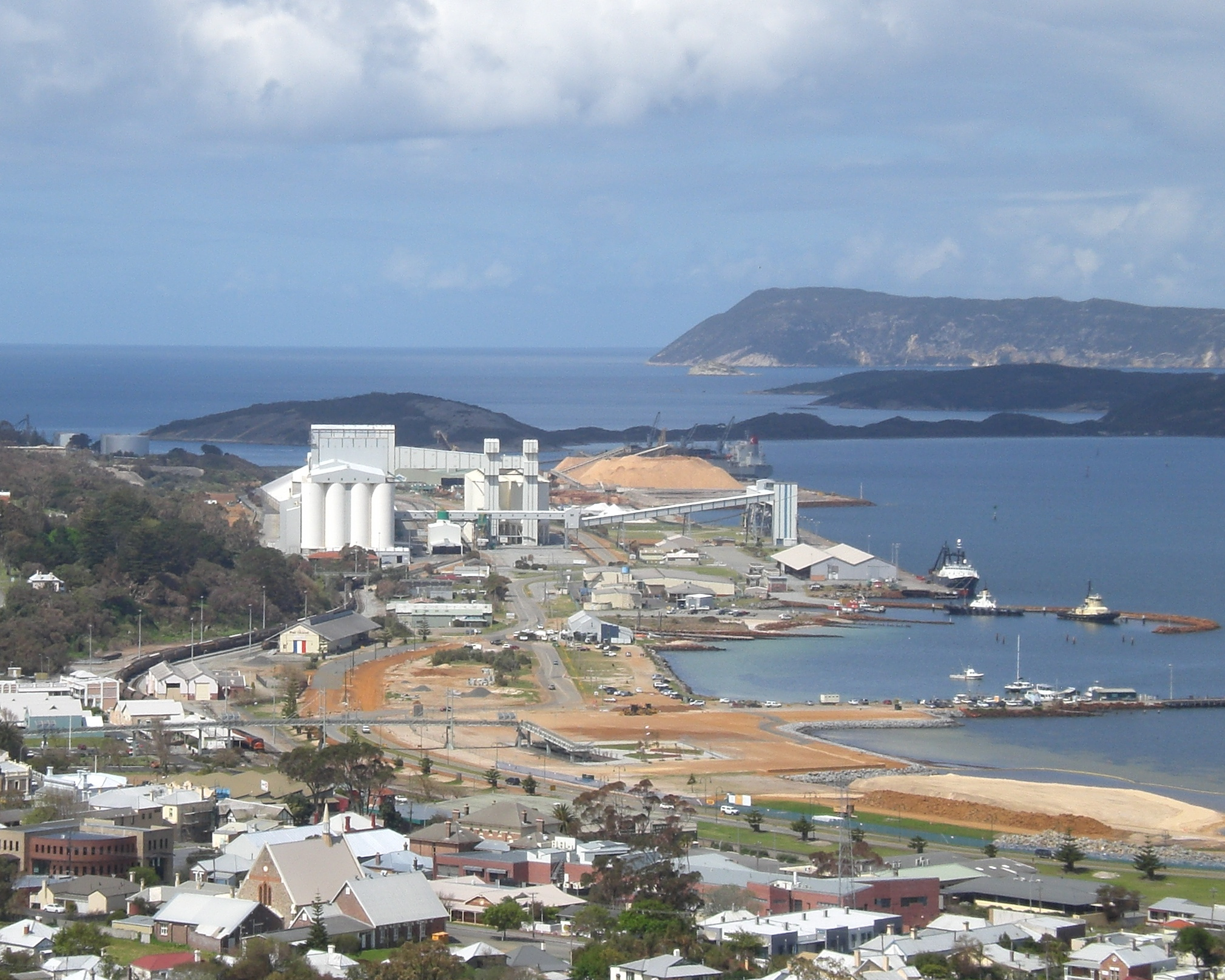
- View of the Port from Mount Melville
- Interactive map of Port of Albany
- Location within Australia

Location
- Country: Australia
- Location: Albany, Western Australia
- Coordinates: 35°02′12″S 117°54′03″E
- UN/LOCODE: AUALH

Details
- Opened: December 1826
- Operated by: Albany Port Authority
- Type of Harbor: Seaport
- No. of berths: 4
- Draft depth: 11.5 m.

Statistics
- Website; Albany Port Authority

The Port of Albany is located within Princess Royal Harbour in King George Sound on the south coast of Western Australia, in the Great Southern region.

== Location ==
The port is located on the northern shore of Princess Royal Harbour, a natural harbour that is part of King George Sound. The city of Albany is adjacent to the port facilities. A dredged shipping channel that has a width of 145 metres (476 ft) and a minimum depth of 12 metres (39 ft) provides an approach to the port from King George Sound. The channel to the port has Point Possession to the south and Point King, at the base of Mount Adelaide, to the north. The body of water between these two points is called Atatürk Entrance.

The Port of Albany takes up a land area of 80 hectares (198 acres), a mixture of crown and freehold land that was managed by the Albany Authority and managed by the Southern Ports Authority since 2014.

== Facilities ==
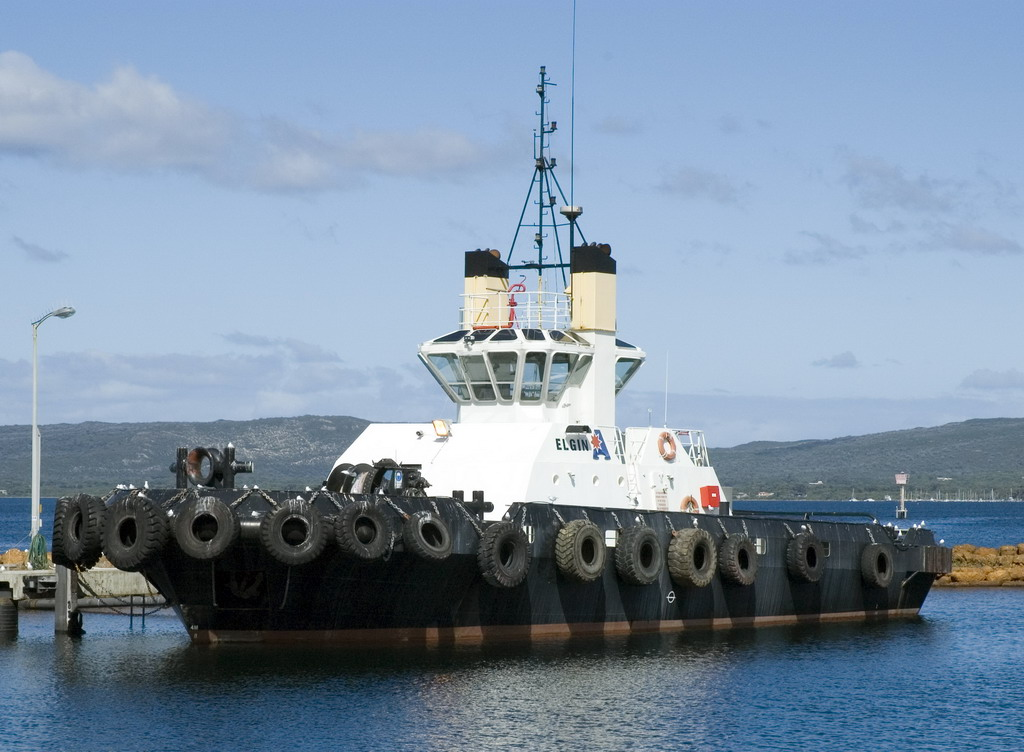
Albany tug boat Elgin

Facilities at the port consist of 4 berths that are currently operational with a site that is ready to develop into a fifth berth when it is required. The port is able to accommodate panamax size vessels with a maximum laden draft of 11.7m, a deepening of the channel is being proposed to allow capesize vessels entry to the port.

The port has two tugs with 45 tonne bollard pull capacity provided by Svitzer, a 12 tonne mobile crane, three forklift trucks (two of 2 tonne, and one of 5 tonne capacity) and a large cold storage facility with volume of 98000 m^{3} at the rear of Berth No. 1.

The port has direct rail access from the Mirambeena Industrial Estate 12 kilometres (7 mi) from, Albany that allows woodchips from the Albany Plantation Export Company's woodchip mill to be transported directly to the port by rail instead of road. The rail line is narrow gauge and continues in a northerly direction to Perth.

The port is able to service both Cargo and Naval vessels with 7 Naval vessels docking at the Port in 2008.

Berth	Length (m)	Depth (m)	Max. draft (m)	Other
Berth No. 1	209	10.4	9.8	Passenger and cruise ship berth and general and bulk cargo
Berth No. 2	172	10.4	9.8	Passenger and cruise ship berth and general and bulk cargo
Berth No. 3	227	12.2	11.5	Bulk cargo loaded via 3 mechanical shiploaders also for container cargo and roll-on/roll-off vessels
Berth No. 5				To be completed for future bulk cargo products
Berth No. 6	216	12.3	11.5	Bulk cargo for woodchips

== History ==
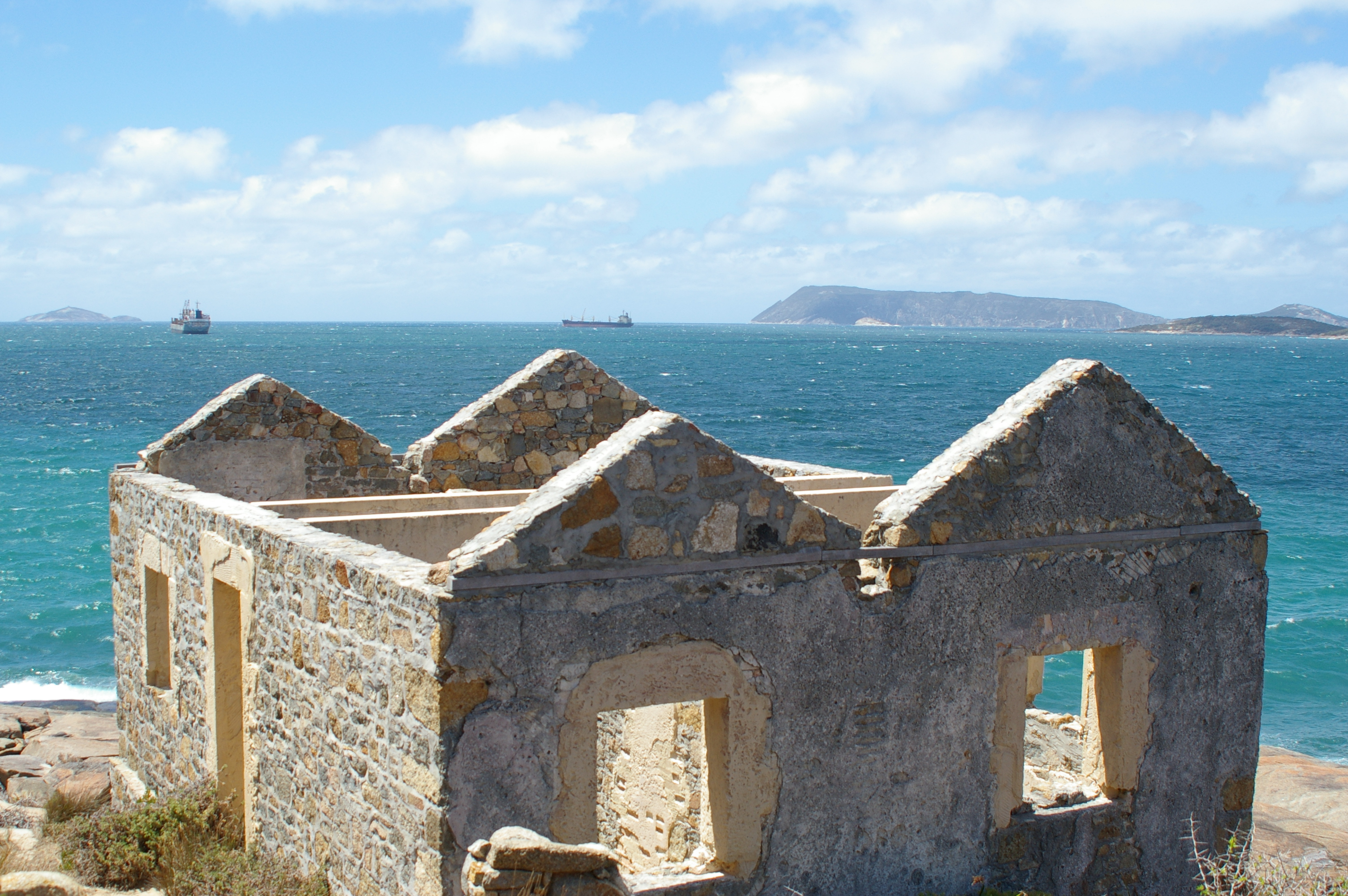
Point King at entrance to Port of Albany

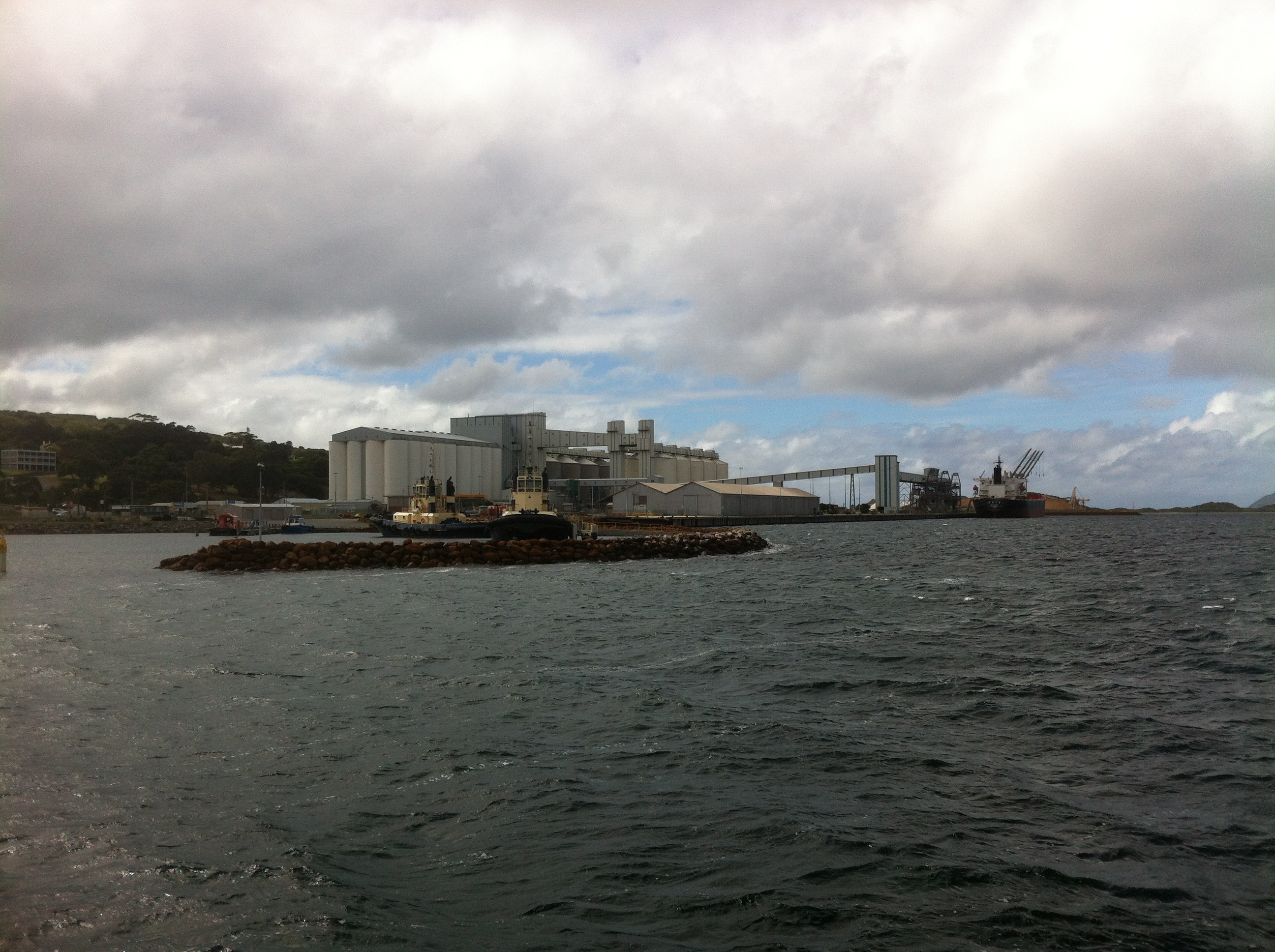
Port facilities from boat pens north of the port

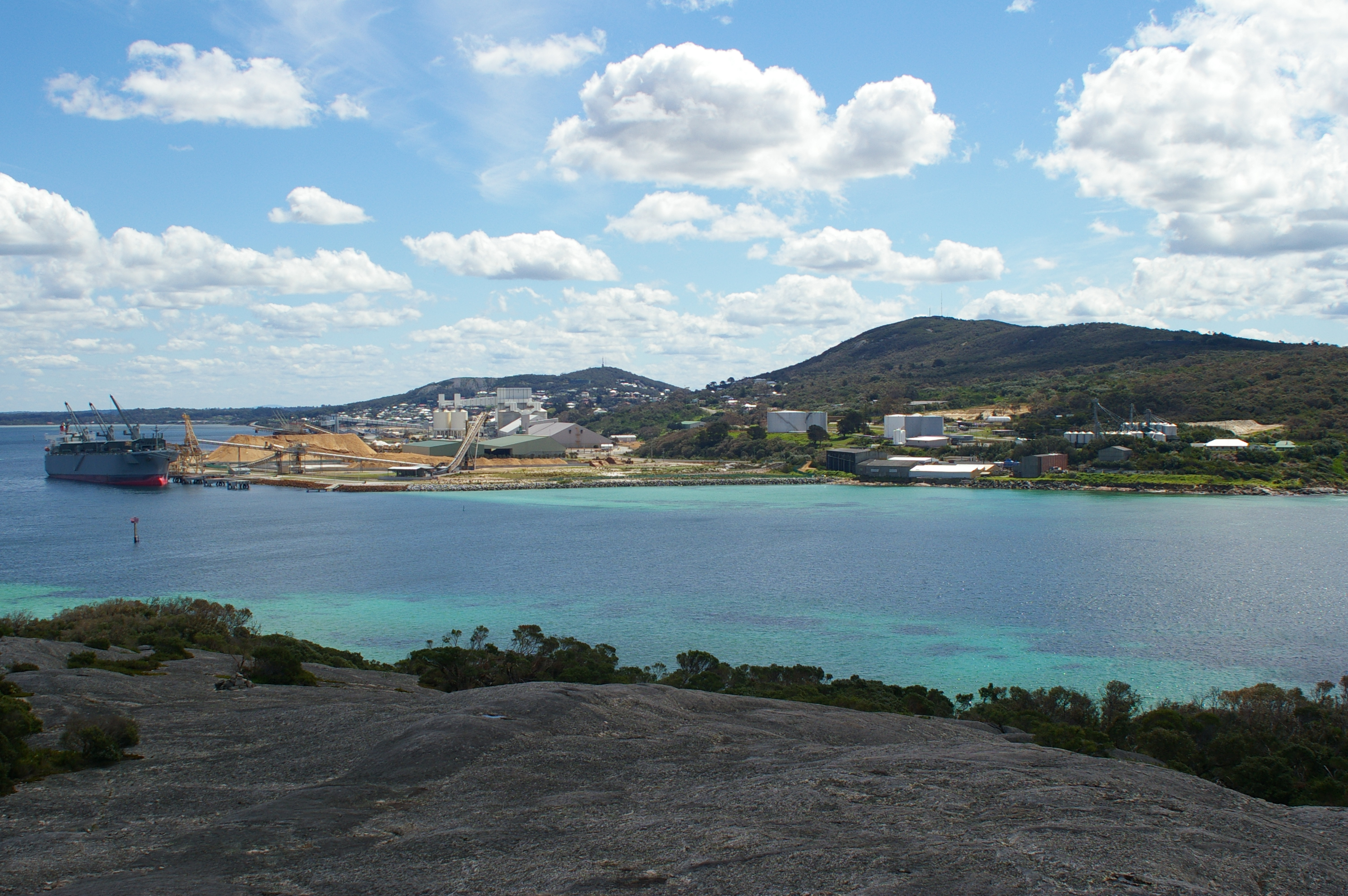
View of the port from Point Possession near Vancouver's Cairn

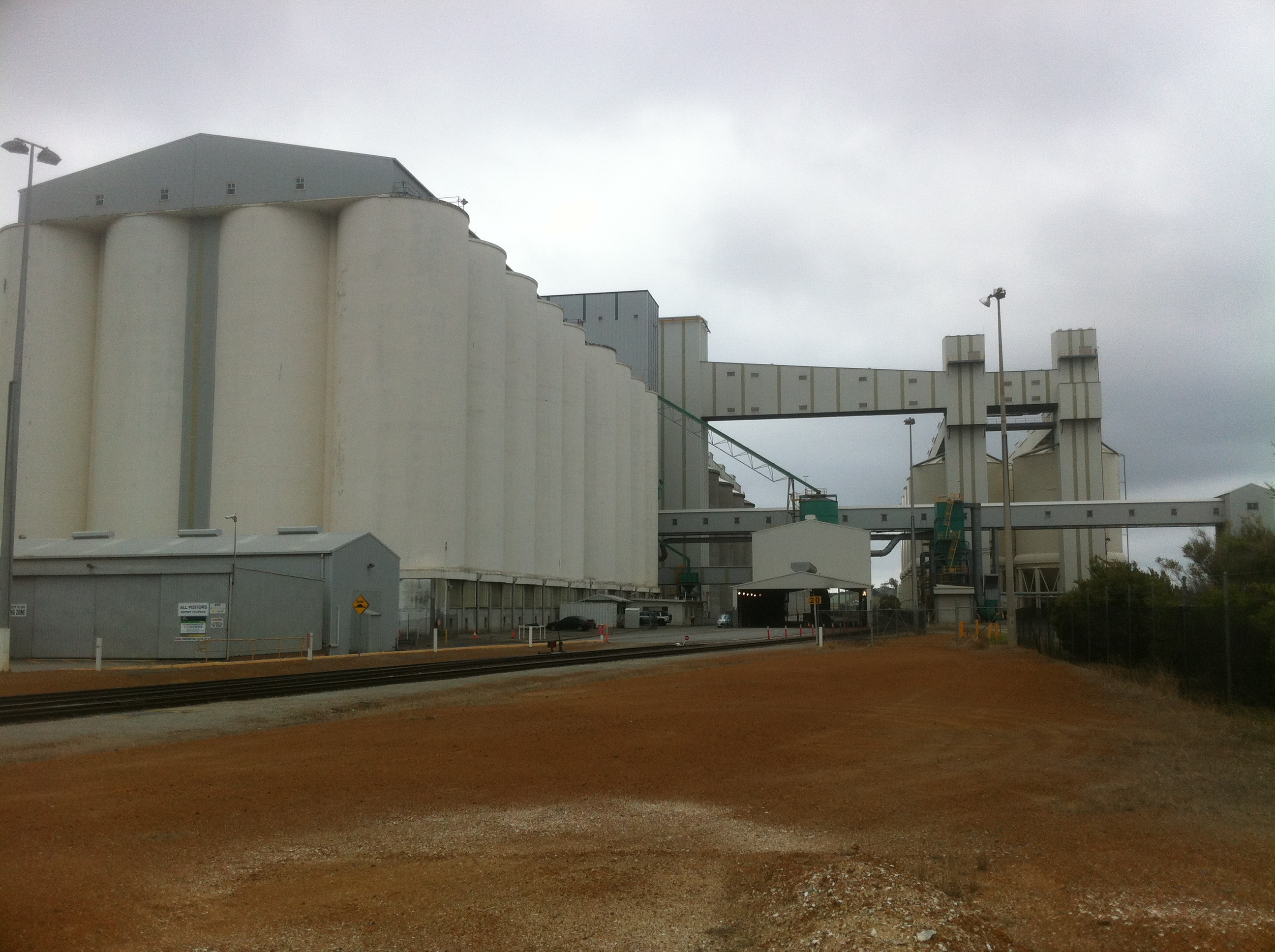
Grain silos at port 2016

Albany Port was the first port in Western Australia and was settled in 1826. Albany was Western Australia's only deep-water port for 70 years until the Fremantle Inner Harbour was opened in 1897.

The first settlers arrived in Albany in December 1826 when Major Edmund Lockyer arrived at the harbour aboard the brig Amity. The port started from humble beginnings when a finger jetty was built between 1862 and 1864 in Princess Royal Harbour. The construction was extended in 1874 and fitted with a T-shaped head and gas lighting.

Dredging and land reclamation around the port area commenced in 1893, with a further five dredging operations taking place between 1901 and 1979. Albany was an important arrival point for migrants and settlers in Western Australia with over 40,000 people arriving between 1839 and 1925.

The Point King Lighthouse, built in 1898, was the first navigational light for the Port of Albany and the second lighthouse to be built on the Western Australian coastline.

The Great White Fleet visited Albany on 11 September 1908 and stayed for one week to take coal aboard as part of the fleet's circumnavigation of the world. The fleet arrived from Melbourne and the next port of call was Manila.

In 2004 2,685,000 tonnes of cargo passed through the port and in 2005 2,990,000 tonnes of cargo was achieved. During this time woodchip exports increased by 105%.

A huge drug seizure was recorded in the port area in 2004 when the Australian Federal Police and the Australian Customs Service recovered 100 kilograms (220 lb) of powder cocaine, worth over $45 million, was recovered from a local beach after being buried in the dunes. The drugs were imported on a bulk grain carrier Marcos Dias having come from South America via South East Asia, three men were arrested as a result.

In 2005 handler and exporter CBH, proceeded with a $130 million upgrade of its grain handling and loading facilities at the port.

The Albany Port Authority won the national Lloyd's Port of the Year award in 2006 for its development of new technology used to restore degraded load-bearing concrete piles without disrupting cargo handling activities.

The port was visited by the Queen Elizabeth II passenger liner in February 2008 as part of its final world trip. Albany was the only regional port that was visited during the Australian leg of the voyage.

The largest vessel ever handled by the port was the Bulk carrier 71,749 dwt Maritime Grace which was partly loaded at the port.

The Albany Port Authority recorded a record profit of A$7.1 million in 2014 after exporting a record 1.4 million tonnes of woodchips. The Albany Port Authority, which had run the port since 1950 was closed down in 2014 when it was merged with the Bunbury and Esperance Port Authorities creating the Southern Port Authority.

== War legacy ==
During dredging in 2000 to expand the harbour, a large amount of unexploded munitions was found at the bottom of the harbour so that Worksafe demanded that dredging cease until the harbour was made safe again. It was consequently found that the ordnance had been spilt during loading of excess munitions to be disposed of at sea in 1947 and 1948 by the Australian Army and Navy. The Albany Port Authority took the Commonwealth government to court to pay for the clean-up of the munitions. The Commonwealth lost the case and were ordered to pay $5.25 million for past and future clean-up costs and an additional $1 million for legal costs. Some of the ammunition that has been found included a 250-pound aerial bomb, 18 pound artillery shells and rifle ammunitions.

== Trade ==
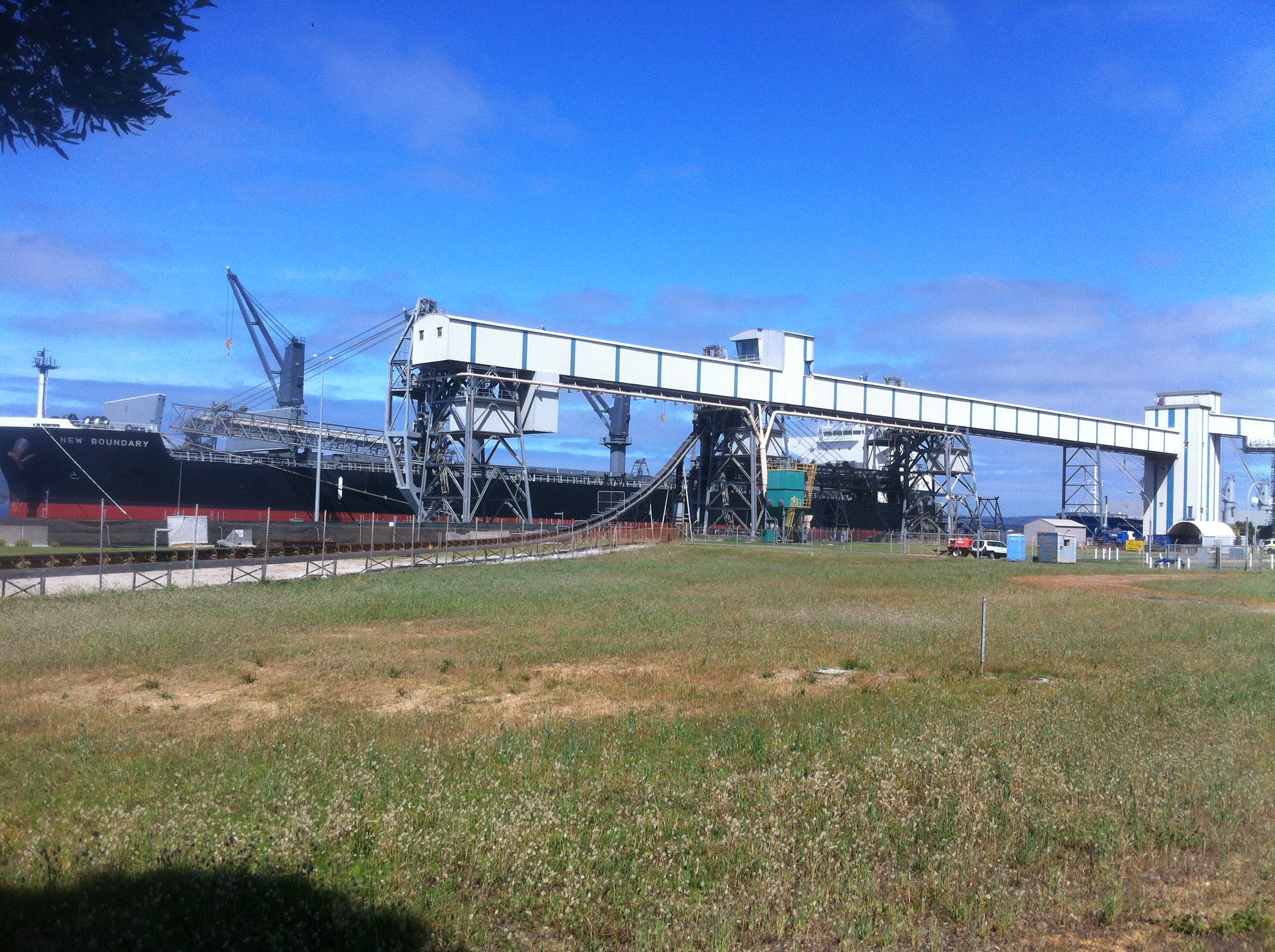
Ship being loaded with grain at Albany Port

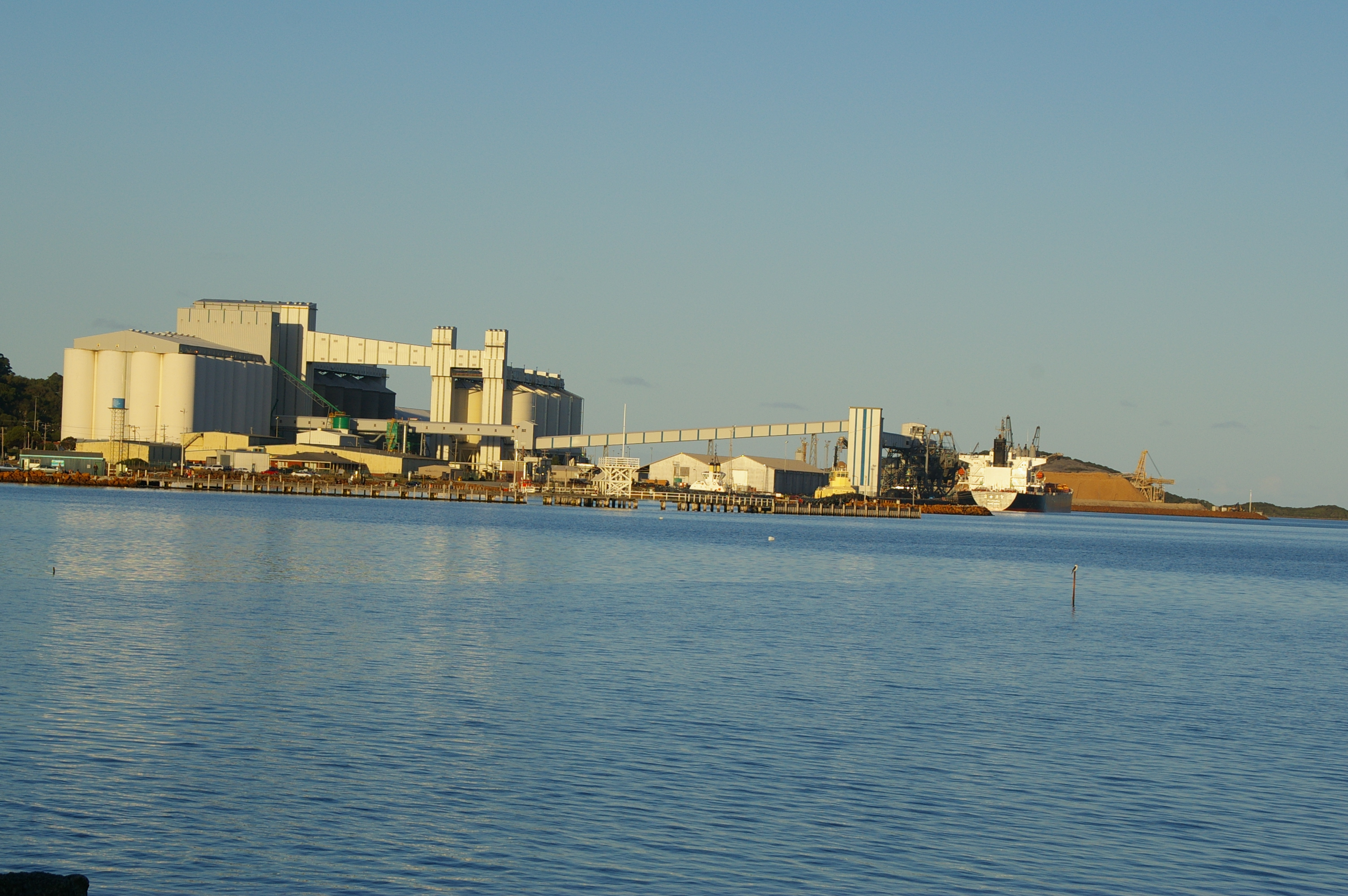
Port of Albany from Princess Royal Drive, west of Albany

The port handles a variety of goods that are imported and exported through the harbour. Products that are commonly imported through Albany port are manufactured fertilizers, fertilizer raw materials, petroleum fuels and fish. Products most commonly exported through the port are woodchips, wheat, silica sand, barley, canola and oats.

Year	Imports (tonnes)	Exports (tonnes)	Total trade (tonnes)	Vessels entering port
2001	244,205	1,429,206	1,673,454	89
2002	160,401	1,434,123	1,594,524	86
2003	147,778	1,813,468	1,961,271	104
2004	156,396	2,684,629	2,841,066	116
2005	156,065	2,834,170	2,990,385	120
2006	121,794	2,538,167	2,660,834	91
2007	92,599	3,408,478	3,501,877	119
2008	111,677	3,554,323	3,666,150	129
2009	144,368	4,024,311	4,168,679	138
2010	130,289	3,292,527	3,423,165	126
2011	114,287	2,952,654	3,069,456	105
2012	107,335	3,348,777	3,456,112	115
2013	121,412	3,979,222	4,100,634	130
2014	107,193	4,454,180	4,562,187	133
2015	150,511	4,717,439	4,875,918	172

Woodchips were first exported from Albany Port in 2002 and by 2007 made up in excess of 40% of the total tonnage exported. The Port contributes significantly to the economy of the Great Southern Region estimated to be in excess of $160 million per annum.

== See also ==
- List of ports in Australia
