= Australian rules football in Western Australia =

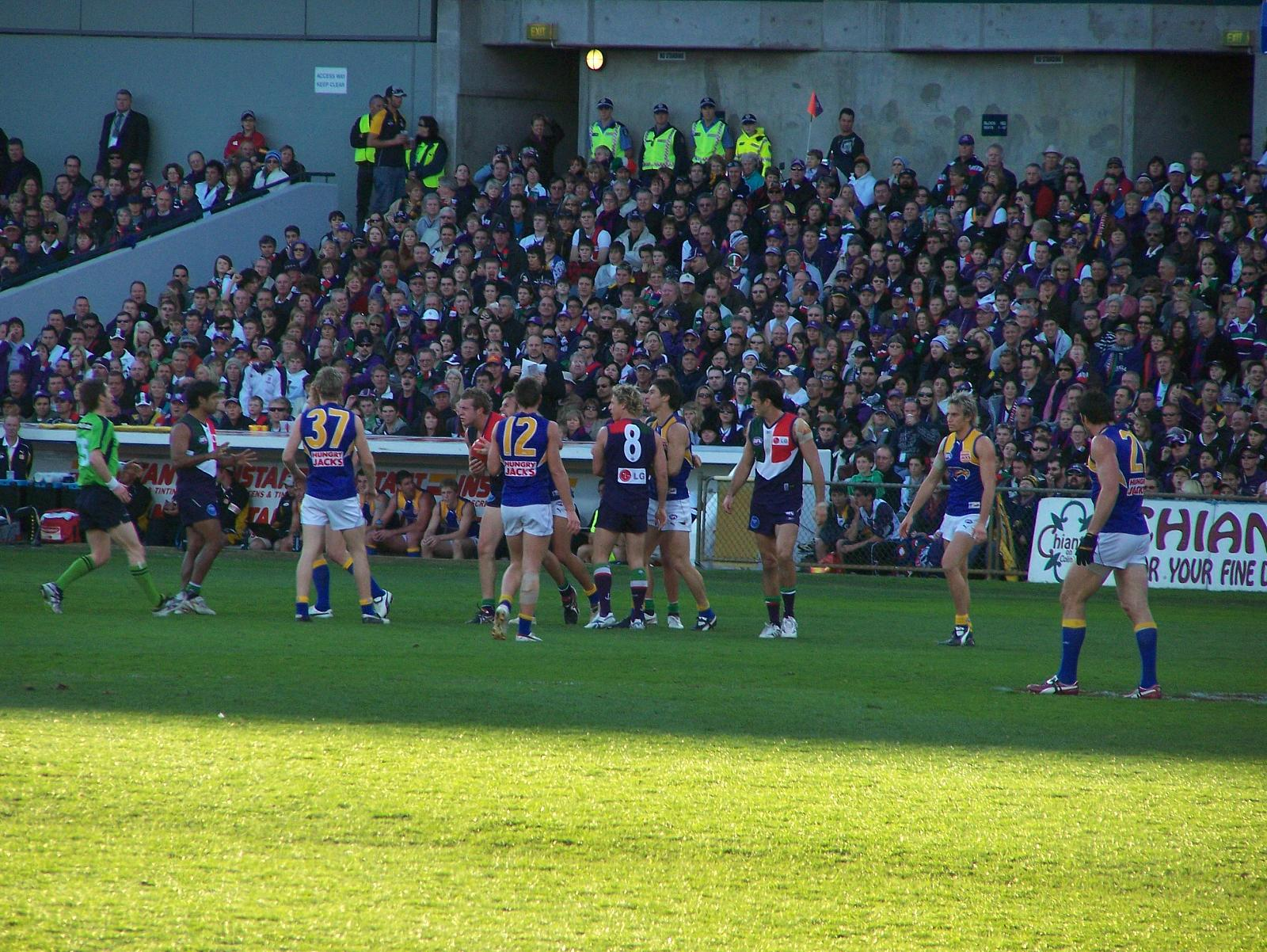
- Western Derby West Coast vs Fremantle at Subiaco Oval in 2008
- Governing body: WA Football
- Representative team: Western Australia
- First played: Perth Melbourne 19 September 1868; 158 years ago
- Registered players: 108,154 (adult); 46,187 (child)
- Clubs: 236 (28 competitions)

Club competitions
- West Australian Football League; Sunday Football League; Western Australian Amateur Football League; West Australian Country Football League; Goldfields Football League; West Kimberley Football Association; Peel Football League; Mortlock Football League

Audience records
- Single match: 61,118 (2021). 2021 AFL Grand Final. Melbourne vs Western Bulldogs. (Optus Stadium, Perth)

In Western Australia, Australian rules football (known mainly as "football") is the most popular sport. There are 29 regional club competitions, the highest profile of which is the semi-professional West Australian Football League. It is governed by WA Football. It has 108,154 adult players (around 10% of which are female) and 46,187 children, the highest participation rate per capita (8.5%) in Australia, second most players of any jurisdiction, accounts for around a fifth of all players nationally and is growing faster than any other state. It is the third most participated team sport after soccer and basketball.

Matches were played in the Colony of Western Australia from 1868, however rugby union there became more popular and Australian rules was not fully established until the 1880s when existing rugby clubs began to switch codes. Following the Federation of Australia, courtesy of pioneering junior and schools programs the sport grew faster there than any other state. For much of the 20th century the West Australian Football League (WAFL) was the third strongest state competition in the country. In 1967 the WAFL set a record season attendance of 960,169 and the 1981 WAFL Grand Final was attended by 55,517. Even with its current semi-professional status, it remains the third most popular competition in the world for the sport.

The state team (known as the "Black Swans" or "Sandgropers") competing since 1904, has defeated every state and territory, and has a strong rivalry with Victoria. It won national titles in 1921, 1961, 1979, 1983, 1984 and 1986, and with four titles was the most successful state in the State of Origin era (1977–1999). The underage men's team, competing since 1976, were champions in 1999, 2007 and 2019. The underage women's team, competing since 2010, were champions in 2014. Western Australia holds the second most national titles after Victoria across all divisions.

The state is home to two fully professional Australian Football League (AFL) clubs both based in the capital Perth and owned by WA Football: West Coast Eagles (1986) and Fremantle Football Club (1994), the former having the distinction of being the first non-Victorian team to compete in and win an AFL Grand Final in 1992. The two teams compete against each other in the Western Derby. The combined membership of the two clubs is more than 150,000, making Western Australia second only to Victoria in terms of support for the national club competition. Since 2020 West Coast has had the highest membership and fastest membership growth in the AFL and is the league's most profitable and equal highest revenue generating club. With the AFL's growth in popularity, Western Australia has oft been speculated as a candidate for a third club, however this is not supported by the state governing body. Nevertheless a 3 year 2 game a year deal was granted to North Melbourne Football Club to play additional matches in Perth and Bunbury from 2025. WA produces the second most professional players for the AFL, with more than 100 current players, though the majority play for clubs in other states.

It is the most watched sport and has the third largest audience in the country. Its television viewership continues to grow strongly and its average AFL attendances are the second highest nationally. Both the AFL and the WAFL attract a significant television audience. Since 1991 it has attracted an average AFL premiership season attendance of 34,462, third in the country. As at 2022 this average attendance sits at 45,921 the second highest, boosted with the 2018 completion of Perth Stadium the state's flagship venue. While the AFL has far surpassed it in popularity, the WAFL also attracts around 200,000 fans through the gates each year as well as a significant television audience.

Three West Australians have been named Australian Football Hall of Fame legends: Graham 'Polly' Farmer, Barry Cable and Merv McIntosh. Lance Franklin holds the AFL games record and goals record for a Western Australian, with 354 and 1,066 respectively. Kiara Bowers is arguably the state's greatest female player being four time All-Australian and the first to win the AFL Women's best and fairest. Gemma Houghton has kicked the most goals, while Emma King has played the most games for born and raised West Australians in the AFL Women's competition.

== History ==
=== Early Beginnings: 1868-1884 ===
On 19 September 1868 a match was played under Australian rules at Bishop's Collegiate School in Perth between local civilians and the visiting 2nd Battalion of Fourteen Foot (Buckinghamshire) who were camped at Mount Eliza, with the honours going to the visiting British troops. It was the first recorded football match of any code in the colony. The Fourteenth Foot had previously played against the Melbourne Football Club in a Challenge Cup match in Melbourne in July of the previous year. Further matches were played between the Western Australian Temperance and Recreation Society defeating the Town of Fremantle in three matches at Fremantle on 16 October. Despite the matches not being played under British rules, the Fremantle Herald cited the English team's involvement as justification for the colony to adopt a British code and Australian football would not be played again for at least a decade.

By 1876 British expatriates in Perth had formed the first (rugby) football clubs and introduced it into the schools in 1879 after which it became the most popular football code, with several clubs playing in organised competitions by 1880.

It was mainly cricketers who agitated for the formation of more football clubs for Perth and Geraldton from 1880 to keep them fit in the off-season however rugby was still seen as the default choice.

Despite this the first Australian rules club, Unions Football Club formed by former Victorians, emerged in Perth between 1881 and 1882. At the time there were already 3 rugby clubs in Perth and the code was still growing rapidly in the colony, though details of the Unions club's activity in this early period are scant. On 30 March 1883, N. A. ("Bill") Bateman and H. Herbert formed a second Australian rules club, The Swans Football Club in Fremantle, commencing a long inter-city football rivalry.

=== Perth clubs switch from rugby: 1885 ===
By the mid-1880s the Western Australian media reported a growing dissatisfaction with rugby as a spectacle, particularly its emphasis on playing the body over playing the ball.

In 1885 one of the leading rugby clubs, Fremantle, after a meeting at the Cleopatra Hotel, decided to change to Australian Rules. It was quickly joined by three other clubs - Rovers, Victorians, and a team of schoolboys from The High School. The schoolboy side lasted just two matches, but the three other sides went on to contest what in retrospect was viewed as the first ever official Western Australian Football Association (WAFA) premiership, won by Rovers.

However, in those days many young men of Perth's wealthier families were educated in Adelaide, the capital of South Australia. On returning home from there they naturally wished to play the sport they'd grown up with and no doubt exerted some influence on their less affluent peers as to such.

=== Football spreads to the goldfields 1886-1890s ===
From 1886 Western Australia was swept up by discoveries of gold, firstly in the Kimberley, Pilbara and Murchison regions, led to a dramatic increase in WA's population, including many players and supporters of Australian Rules from the eastern colonies.

Progress of Australian Rules in Western Australia still lagged behind the big football cities of Melbourne, Adelaide and Geelong however and is evidenced by the unstable nature of the clubs that participated in the early years.

In 1886 a new Fremantle based club Union joined. Unions would later rename themselves Fremantle as those involved in the game saw the need to identify themselves with the region they were located in.

In 1887 Fremantle left the WAFA and the West Australian Football Club joined but they would only play two seasons before they disappeared.

=== Australian rules booms: 1890s and 1900s ===
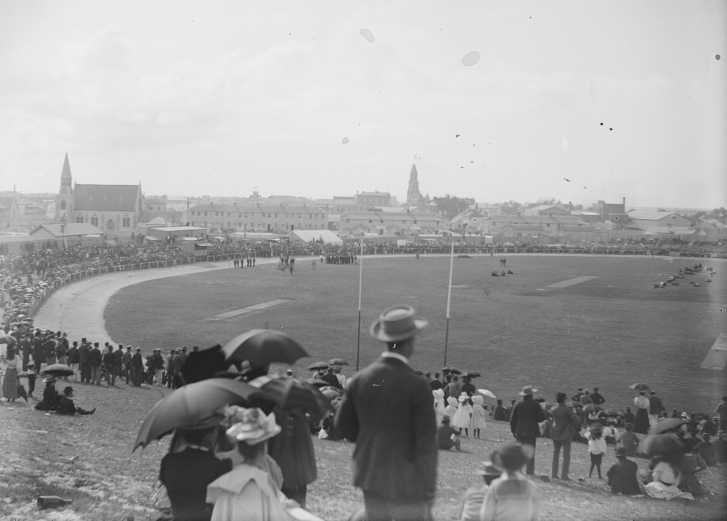
Football at Fremantle Oval circa 1895

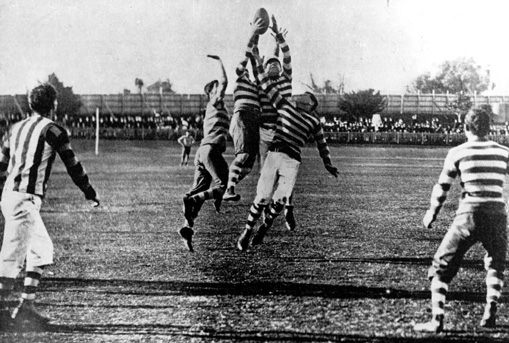
Football match Fremantle Oval 1910

1891 saw two new clubs arrive, Centrals and East Perth, but they would be gone after one and two seasons respectively.

The Western Australian gold rushes began in the 1880s but accelerated in 1892 with major gold discoveries at Coolgardie and Kalgoorlie. Coupled with a major international economic depression, caused increased immigration from the eastern colonies. These migrants included a large number of footballers including some celebrated players, and the Goldfields competition (later known as the Goldfields Football League) which began in 1896 was comparable in status and standard to the Perth competition for many years. (This was shown by the fact that it had a separate seat on the Australian National Football Council until 1919.) The higher standard of play that naturally followed, helped to increase the game's popularity and increased the professionalism of the WAFA.

1899 would be the last season Fremantle would take part in the WAFA. Despite Unions/Fremantle being the most dominant club in the WAFA up to this point winning the competition 10 times in its 13 years of existence, problems with debt saw the club disappear and some people involved with the old entity formed South Fremantle Football Club in its place. Despite the fact that many involved with Fremantle moved onto South Fremantle the new club is not seen as a continuation of the old and did not lay claim to its proud records to that date.

1899 was also the last time Rovers would take part. The move to regionalisation which saw Unions take on the old Fremantle's name and colours made it difficult for this club that didn't represent a particular area to attract players. They folded and were immediately replaced by Perth Football Club who were promoted from the Perth First Rate Association.

By 1901, the WAFA had grown to have six teams. Up to this point, five sides at most had been in the competition, and this number had invariably changed from year to year, as clubs came and went. And by 1906 there were eight teams — being West Perth, East Perth, East Fremantle, South Fremantle, North Fremantle, Subiaco, Perth and Midland Junction.

In 1908 the WAFA was renamed the West Australian Football League (WAFL). West Australia sent a team to the 1908 Melbourne Carnival, over half of the team was from the goldfields league. Its success at the tournament including its defeat of South Australia and appearance in the final against Victoria captured the West Australian public and ushered in an era of immense growth for the code.

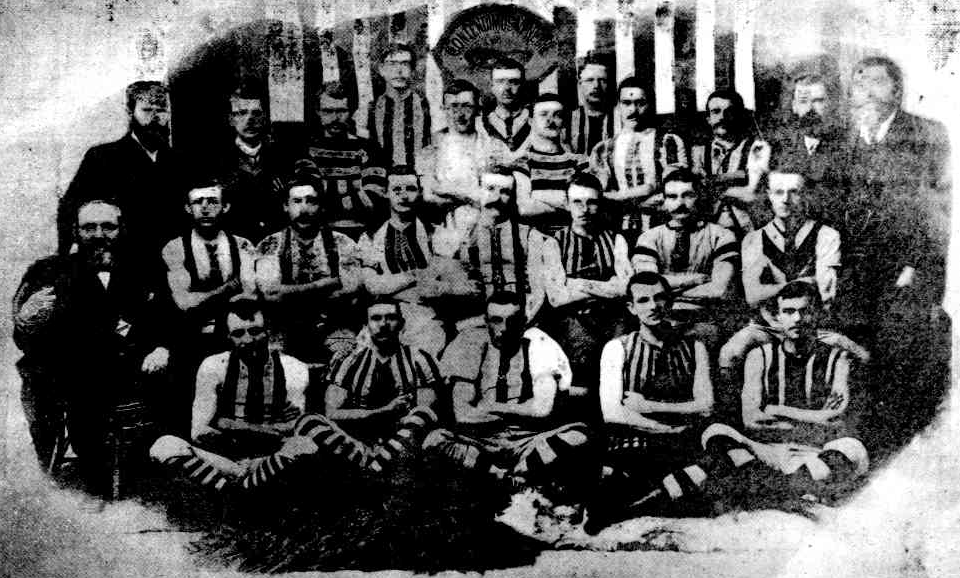
Fremantle Football Club WA premiers 1893

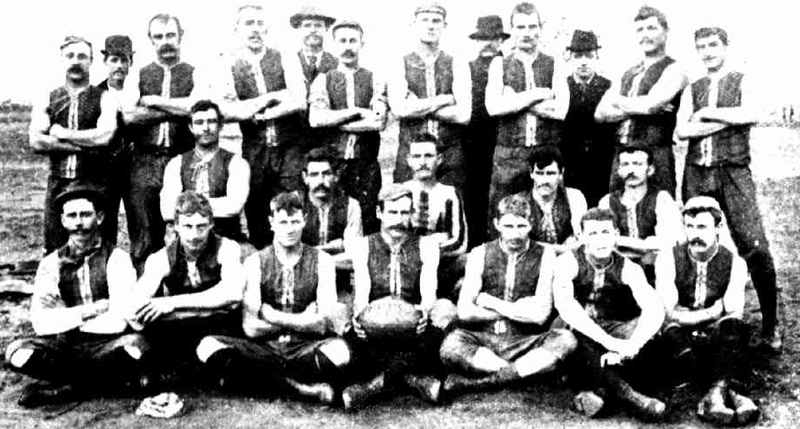
Bonnie Vale Football Club in 1896, one of dozens of clubs which sprang up during the West Australian gold rushes

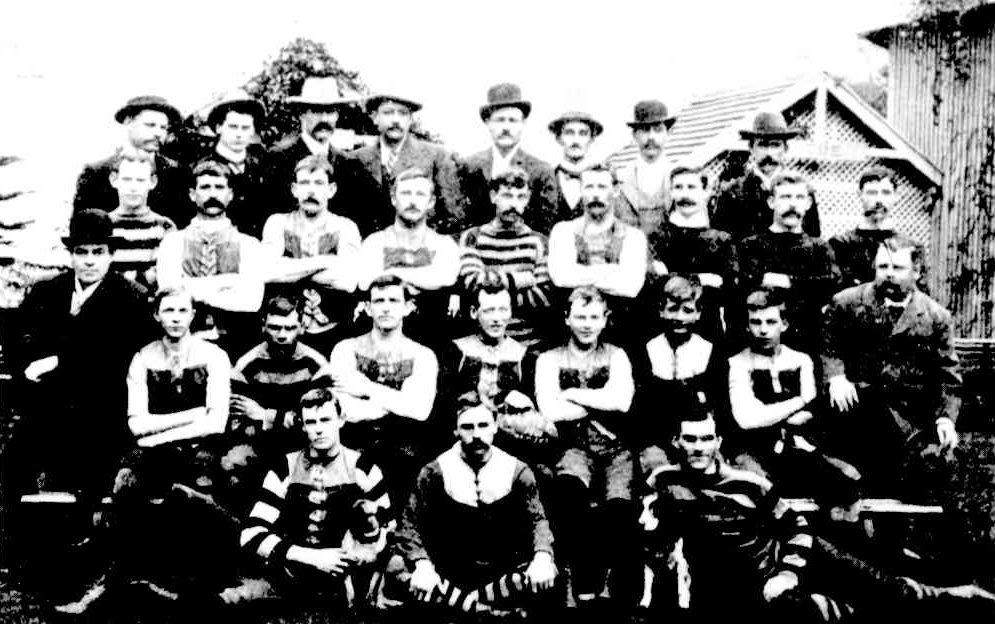
West Perth Football Club in 1901

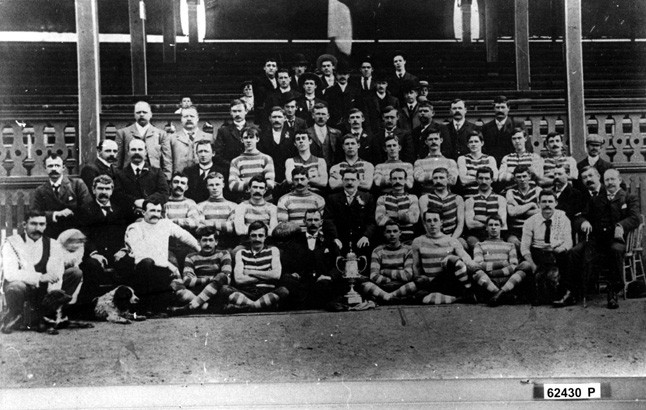
East Fremantle WAFL premiers 1903

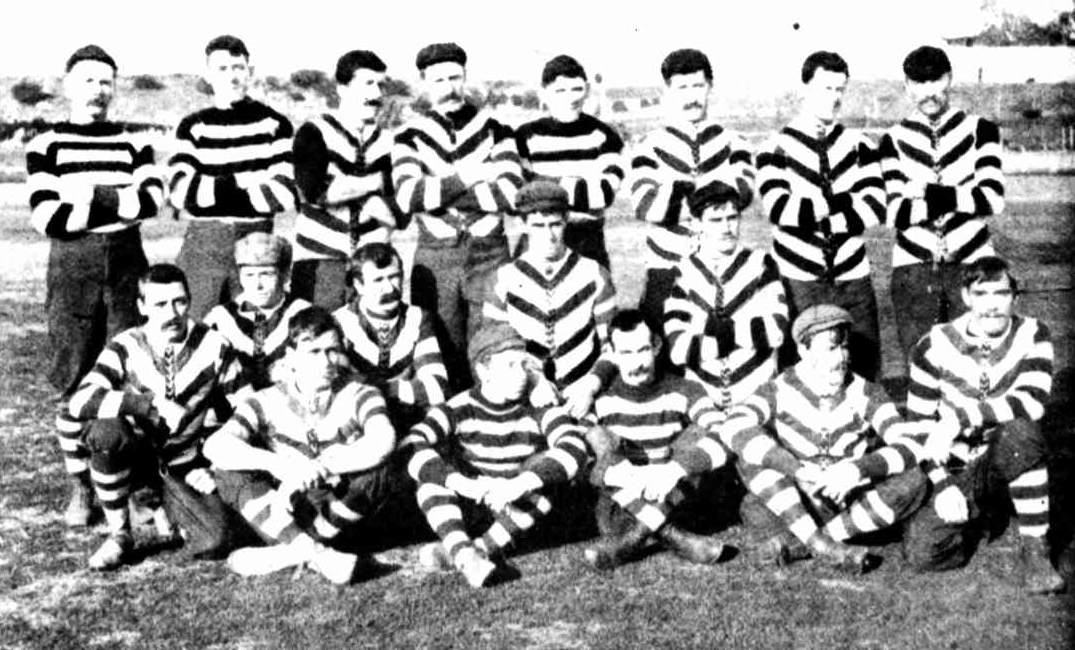
South Fremantle Football Club 1905

=== World War I and the WAFL's Youth Policy ===
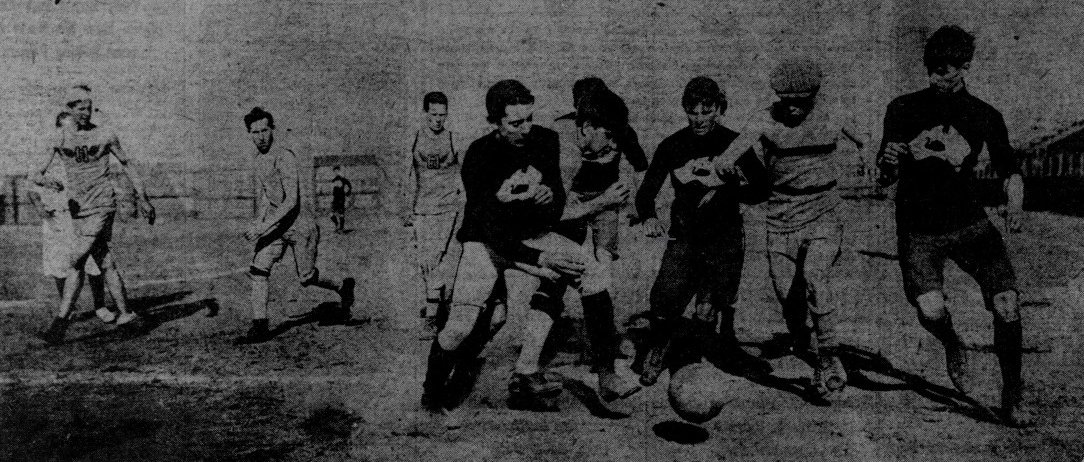
The Young Australia Football League competing against the US in 1911.

Jack Simons (WAFL secretary between 1905 and 1914) believed that the future of the code was its introduction to schools. Senior player numbers were already beginning to wane and junior teams were suffering catastrophic loss of numbers. Simons believed the league could not continue without a younger generation. Simons was concerned with encroachment of soccer, rugby and other "non-Australian" sports was threatening the game at grassroots level. Along with several prominent Western Australians including Lionel Boas, Simons formed the Young Australia Football League in 1905 as a development organisation. Confident that Australian Football offered the greatest game in the world, his work included overseas tours and invitational teams. These initiatives would lead to the game's establishment in the schools and provide a boom in junior player numbers which would see competition continue through the war and a generation of new players introduced to the game.

Unlike many other sporting competitions, the WAFL didn't go into recess during World War I, although two teams — North Fremantle and Midland Junction — were "casualties" of the war, competing for the last time in 1915 and 1917 respectively.

=== Between the Wars ===
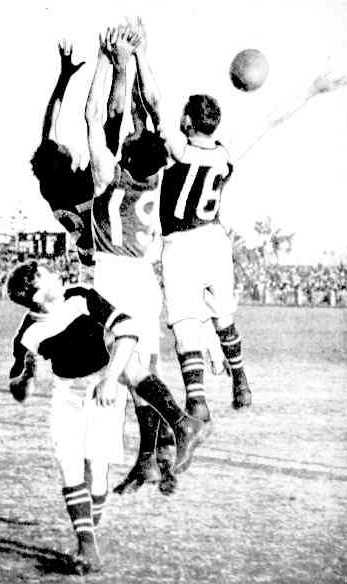
Western Australia defeated South Australia at the 1921 Perth Carnival in front of 26,461 at the Perth Oval to win its first national title

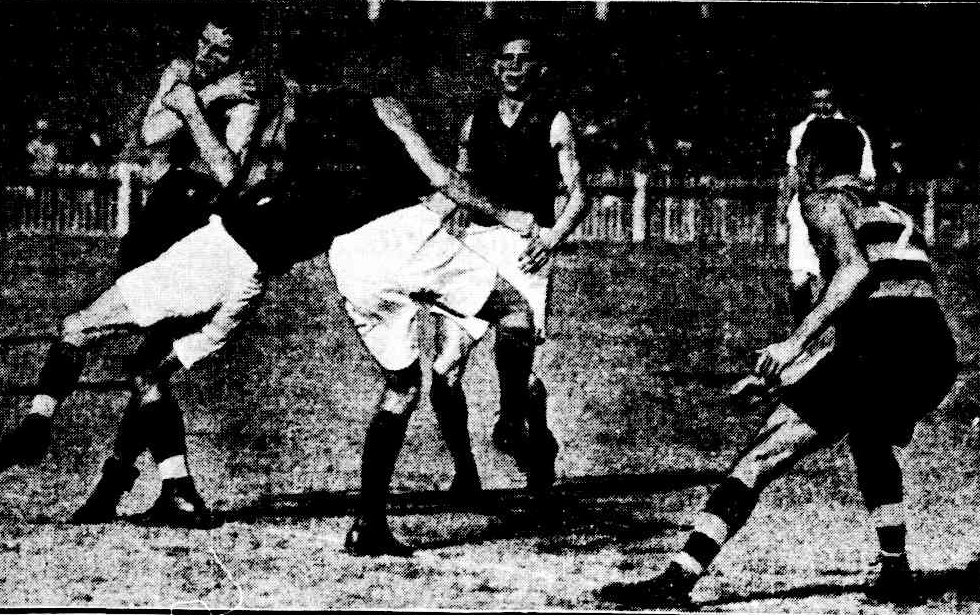
Claremont vs West Perth at Leederville Oval in 1930

In 1921, Western Australia hosted the first national carnival, known as the 1921 Perth Carnival it went on to win all of its matches to take the title from Victoria. In 1921, the WAFL introduced the Sandover Medal, for the fairest and best player over a season, as voted by the field umpires. The medal has been awarded annually ever since.

Claremont entered the WAFL in 1926, bringing the number of teams back to seven.

In 1932, the WAFL was renamed the Western Australian National Football League (WANFL) - the "national" concept in the name being adopted by the SANFL and a couple of other leagues a few years earlier.

Swan Districts entered the league in 1934. The eight competing sides still remain today and are generally referred to as the "traditional eight clubs".

Despite WA's poineering efforts in junior development early in the century, by the 1930s the game had all but disappeared from the public school system and a lack of juniors was beginning to hurt the senior leagues, in response the WAFL re-commenced a junior development program.

Because of World War Two, the league only ran an "under age" competition between 1942 and 1944. However, the three premierships won during this time are given equal status to any other, in official records. All clubs competed, with the exception of Swan Districts who could not form a team in 1942, although they were back in 1943.

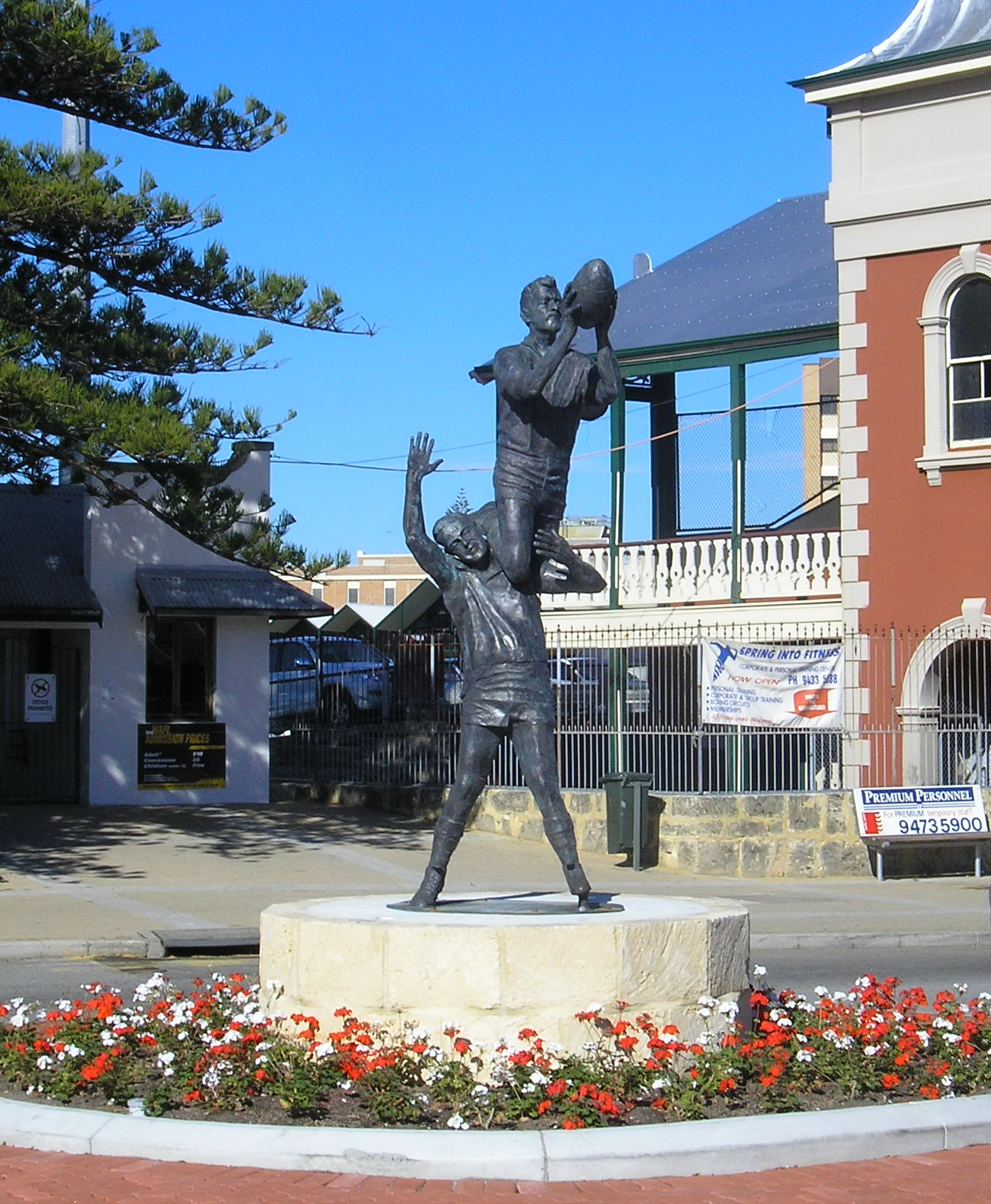
Statue by Robert Hitchcock outside the gates Fremantle Oval of the famous "specky" by South Fremantle Football Club's John Gerovich over East Fremantle Football Club's Ray French at the 1956 WANFL preliminary final.

=== Post-war period ===
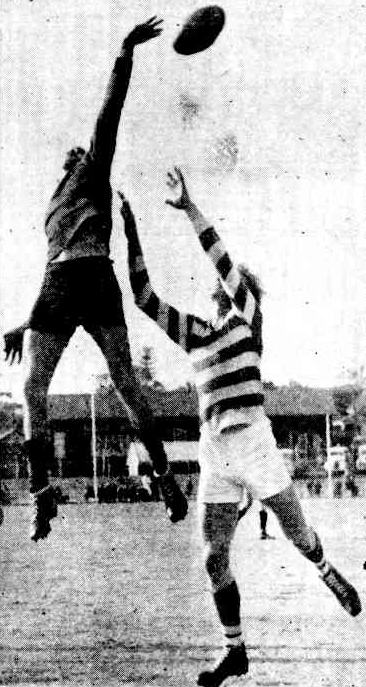
A young Polly Farmer flies high over Jack Clarke of East Fremantle in 1954

The 1960s saw crowds grew, as WAFL football , and in the 1970s and early 80s it was the best attended-spectator sport in Western Australia.

However, during this period more and more star WAFL players were looking to head to the Victorian Football League (VFL), enticed by the bigger money and the fact that it was more and more gaining a reputation as the "big" league.

This is perhaps best evidenced in that Victoria (i.e. the VFL representative team) had by far the best record in interstate games for a long time. But in 1977, when the first proper State of Origin match was played, it saw Western Australia inflict its biggest defeat on a Victorian team.

In 1980, the WANFL dropped the "N" and the "ern" and reverted to being called the WAFL.

At this time crowds were as big as they ever were. Soon afterwards, however, interest in the WAFL began a slow decline, as it became increasingly obvious that even larger numbers of the WAFL's best players were going to head east.

=== Entering the National Competition ===
By 1987, the WAFL had decided that the future of the game in WA depended on it entering a team in the VFL. The West Coast Eagles were formed and entered the VFL (the VFL was renamed the AFL in 1990). With many of Western Australia's best players now competing in a team that represented Western Australia on a national scale, it was suddenly apparent that the WAFL was now a second-class competition.

In 1990 the state league was renamed the Western Australian State Football League, but it had reverted to WAFL by 1991.

In 1992, the West Coast Eagles made history by becoming the first interstate club to win an AFL premiership. The win resulted in a huge boost to the side's popularity, put pressure on Subiaco Oval to expand and ultimately led to demand for a second AFL licence for the state.

Another locally based AFL team, the Fremantle FC were formed in 1995.

The popularity of the AFL with 2 sides, particularly with the Western Derby, cemented the position of the WAFL as a second-class competition. WAFL clubs have struggled ever since with their sudden demise from being technically equal to any VFL club, to feeder club status. However, they have enjoyed some benefits, such as the funds flowing from the WA-based AFL teams and the influx of talented players from other states, attempting to make a name for themselves.

In 1997, Peel Thunder — somewhat controversially — became the ninth WAFL club. Throughout their brief history, they have struggled to compete with the traditional eight clubs, which are generally opposed to their presence. This is partly because having an odd number of teams forces one team to have a bye each week. Also in 1997, the WAFL was renamed Westar Rules, in an attempt to revamp its image. The name again reverted to WAFL in 2001, when the "Fong Report" declared "Westar Rules" as "a painfully contrived name", although the new 1997 logo was retained.

Recent years have seen the WAFL stabilise itself as a league a step down from the AFL. Obviously the sudden player drain brought on by the expansion of the VFL into the AFL has lessened the standard of play, however this has recovered somewhat, with "veteran" AFL players returning and new players coming through.

=== Recent History ===
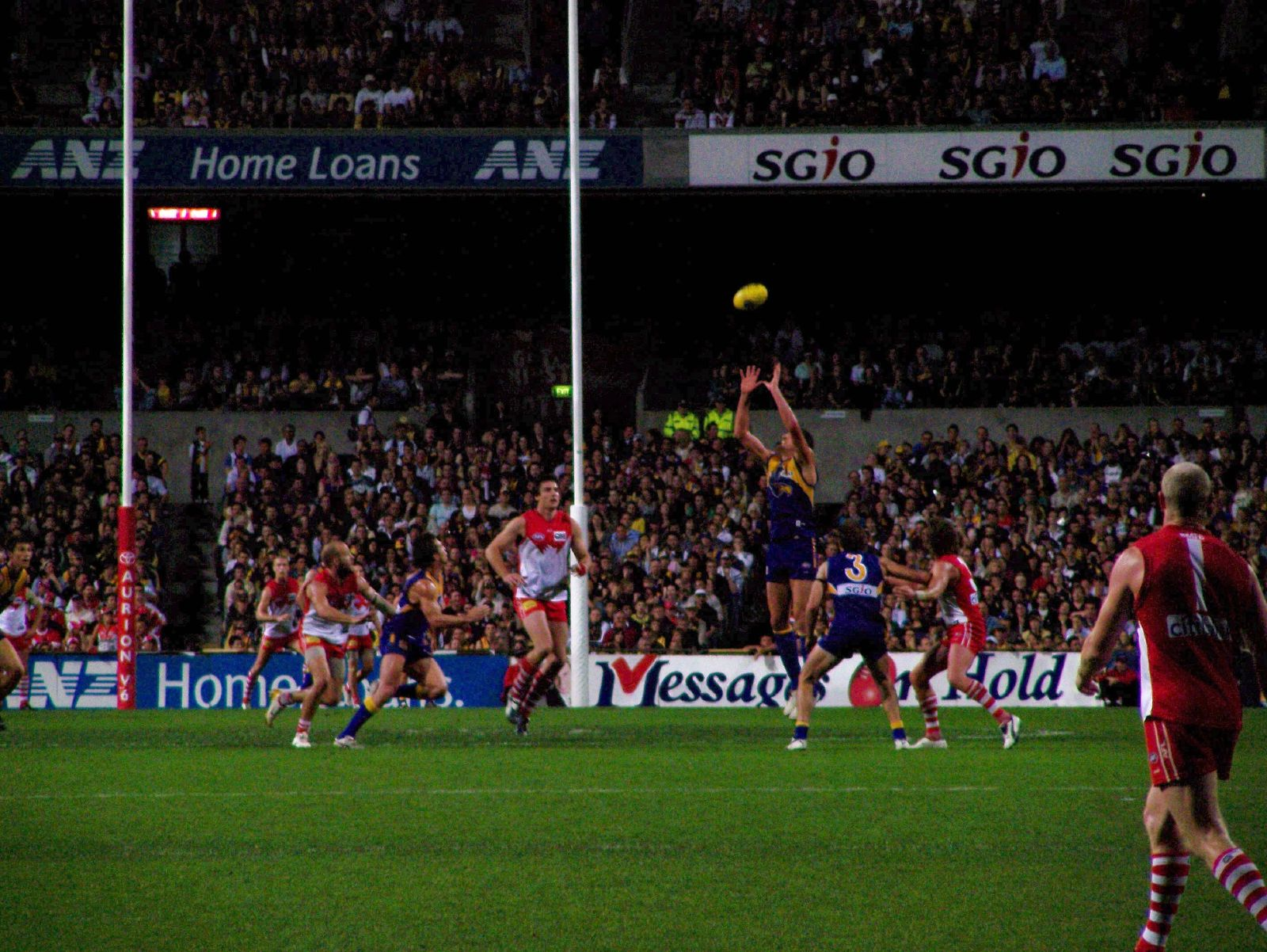
AFL West Coast playing Sydney in Perth in 2006

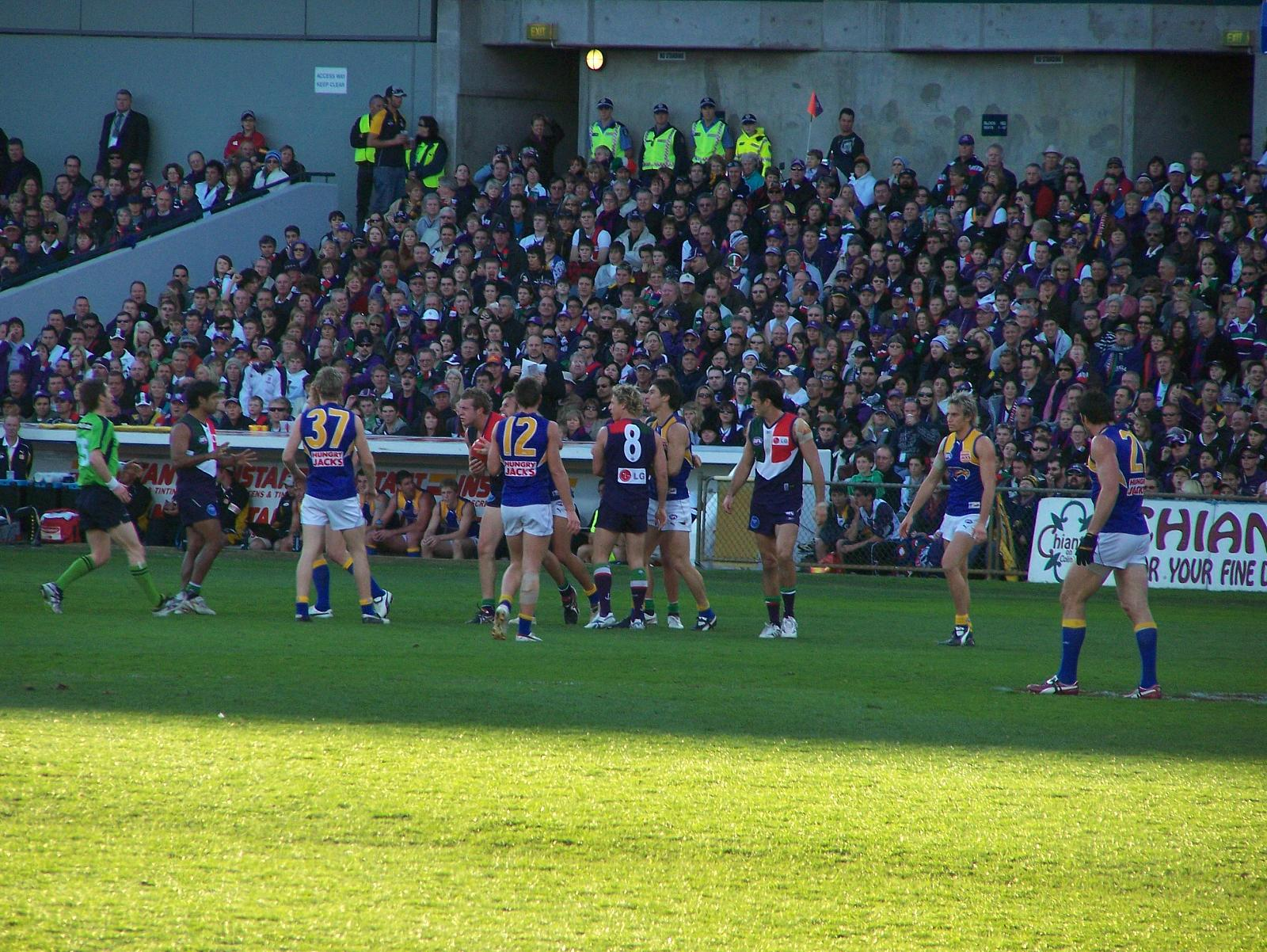
Shaun McManus' farewell game in Round 18 2008 Western Derby Fremantle home game

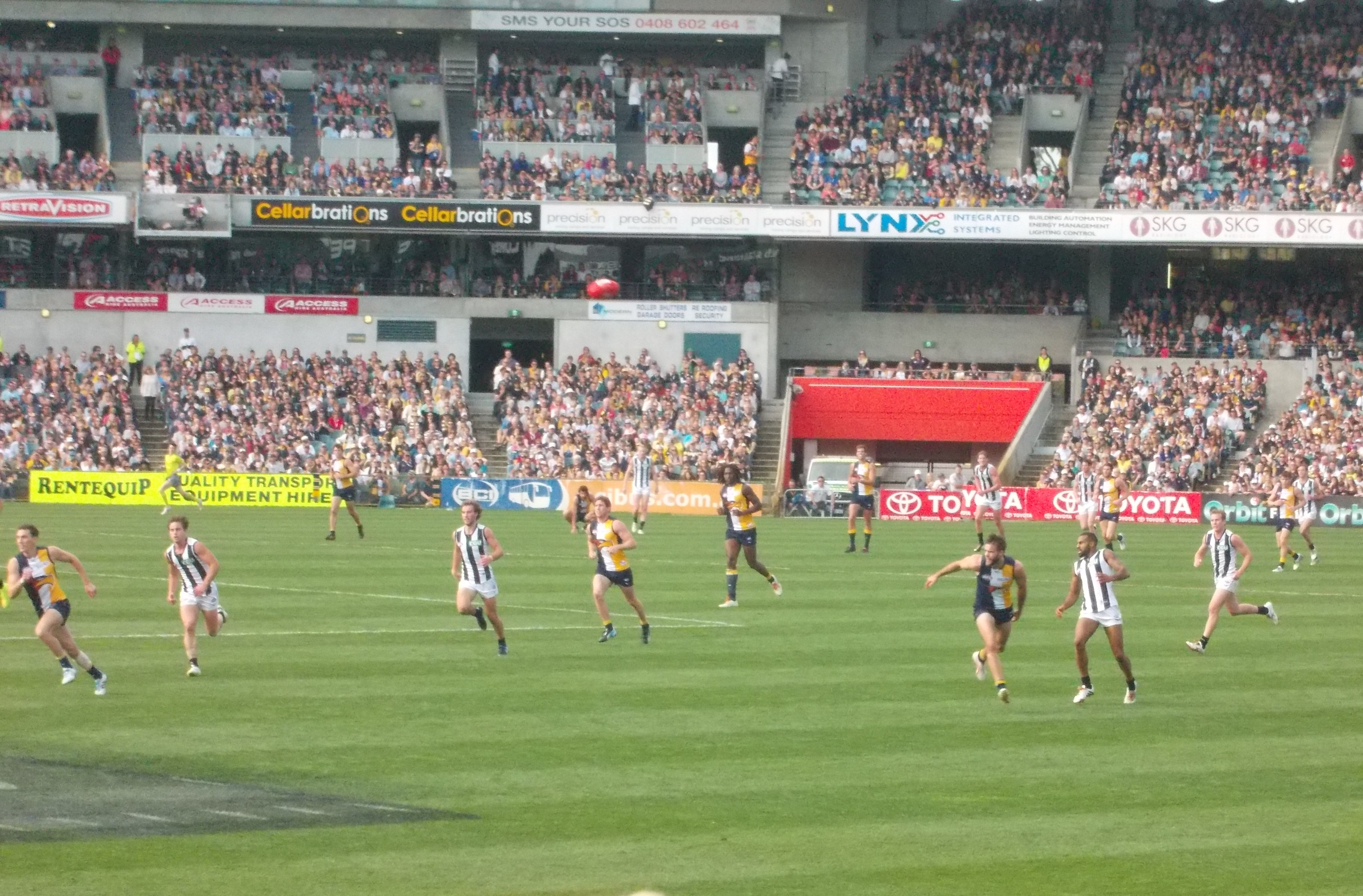
West Coast vs Collingwood at Subiaco Oval in 2014

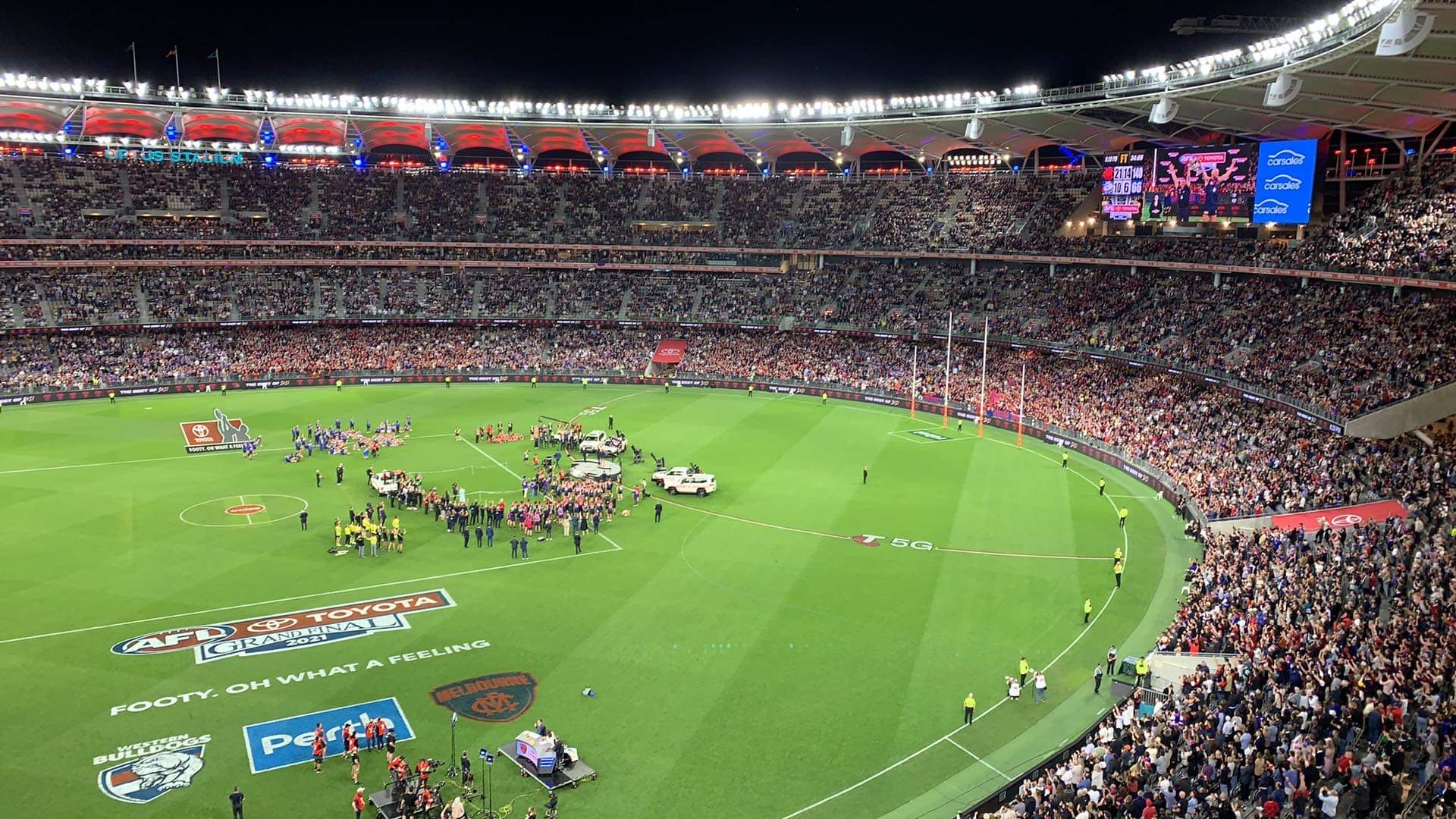
2021 AFL Grand Final at Perth Stadium

Western Australia was the first state to trial the derivative social game of Rec Footy in 2003.

Involvement and attendance in Australian Rules reached record levels in Western Australia 2004. The total attendance, including AFL games was a record 1,030,000. The 2005 WAFL grand final between South Fremantle and Claremont attracted 22,570 to Subiaco Oval.

In 2006, the combined membership of Fremantle and West Coast AFL clubs was a record 79,804 members.

The AFL in 2024 announced it wanted to bring more matches to Western Australia and in November 2024 announced that the North Melbourne Football Club would play 2 home matches in Perth and one in Bunbury.

== Audience ==
=== Attendance Record ===
- 59,608 (2018). AFL Preliminary Final. West Coast Eagles v Melbourne. (Optus Stadium, Perth)

== Major Australian Rules Events in Western Australia ==
- Australian Football League Premiership Season (West Coast Eagles and Fremantle home games)
- Western Derby
- West Australian Football League Grand Final

== Representative teams ==
"Sandgropers" 1995 State of Origin guernsey.

The Western Australian Australian football team is nicknamed alternatively the "Sandgropers" or the "Black Swans" and have played representative matches, either as State of Origin or as a state team representing the WAFL against all other Australian states.

=== Uniforms ===
Western Australia

== Governing body ==
The governing body for Australian rules football in WA is the West Australian Football Commission.

== Competitions ==
Location of regional governing bodies and active competitions (yellow is competitions run in other jurisdictions with WA clubs with points indicating headquarters or approximate epicentres of WA clubs)

=== Club ===
==== Men's ====
League	Years of WA clubs or affiliation	Senior WA clubs	Divisions	Headquarters	Notes
West Australian Football League (WAFL)	1885–	10		Perth	Semi-professional (2nd tier)
Goldfields Football League	1896–	5		Kalgoorlie	
Gascoyne Football Association	1908–	4		Carnarvon	
West Kimberley Football Association	1921–	8		Broome	
North Midlands Football League	1921–	6		Morawa	
Perth Football League (PFL)	1922–	75	9: A Grade, B Grade, C-Grade (5 division), E Grade, Colts	Perth	Amateur only
Mortlock Football League	1946–	7		Goomalling	
Hills Football Association	1946–	6		Bullsbrook	
Esperance District Football Association	1956–	4		Esperance	
South West Football League	1957–	11		Bunbury	
Avon Football & Netball Association (AFA)	1959–	7		Northam	
Lower South West Football League	1959–	7		Manjimup	
Upper Great Southern Football League (UGSFL)	1959–	8		Stoneville	
West Australian Country Football League (CWFA)	1959–	7		Tuart Hill	
Eastern Districts Football League	1960–	8		Bruce Rock	
Great Northern Football League	1961–	7		Mullewa	
Ongerup Football Association	1962–	5		Albany	
Central Wheatbelt Football League	1968–	5		Mukinbudin	
Ravensthorpe & Districts Football Association	1968–	2		Lake King	
East Kimberley Football League	1970–	12	2: North, South	Kununurra	
Fortescue National Football League	1970–	4		Tom Price	
Newman National Football League	1972–	4		Newman	
North Pilbara Football League	1977–	6		Karratha	
Sunday Football League	1984–2008			Perth	Disbanded
Australian Football League (AFL)	1987–	2	1 Senior	Melbourne, Victoria	West Coast Eagles, Fremantle Football Club fully professional clubs
Central Kimberley Football Association	1991–	6		Fitzroy Crossing	
Great Southern Football League	1991–	6		Albany	
Central Midlands Coastal Football League	1992–	5		Moora	
Peel Football League	1992–	9		Mandurah	
Sunday Football League (SFL)	1993–	7		Perth	Amateur only

- Masters Australian Football WA Official Site

==== Women's ====
- West Australian Women's Football League Official Site

== Principal Venues ==
The following venues meet AFL Standard criteria and have been used to host AFL (National Standard) or AFLW level matches (Regional Standard) are listed by capacity.

Perth	Perth	Fremantle
Perth Stadium	Bassendean Oval	East Fremantle Oval
Capacity: 60,000	Capacity: 22,000	Capacity: 20,000
Perth Stadium	Bassendean Oval	East Fremantle Oval
Fremantle	Perth	Geraldton
Fremantle Oval	Arena Joondalup	Wonthella Oval
Capacity: 17,500	Capacity: 16,000	Capacity: 12,000
Fremantle Oval	Arena Joondalup	
Perth	Mandurah	Perth
Leederville Oval	Rushton Park	Lathlain Park
Capacity: 10,000	Capacity: 10,000	Capacity: 6,500
Bunbury
Hands Oval
Capacity: 5,000

=== Historic Venues ===
- Subiaco Oval (1930s-2017)
- WACA Ground (1899-2000)

=== Modern AFL Standard Venues ===
- Perth Stadium (2018-)
- Fremantle Oval (1890s-)
- Arena Joondalup
- Leederville Oval
- East Fremantle Oval
- Claremont Oval
- Bassendean Oval
- Lathlain Park
- Rushton Park
- Wonthella Oval, Geraldton
- Collingwood Park, Albany
- Centennial Stadium, Albany

== Players ==
=== Participation ===
In 2024 there were 108,154 registered adult players, marginally less than play soccer in the state. The participation rate per capita is 4.6% the second highest nationally.

Category	2007	2016	2019	2021/22	2023/24
Adult Male		68,733	72,327	87,321	97,025
Adult Female		10,871	15,941	14,892	10,703
Total	12,050	79,604	88,268	102,213	108,154

=== Past greats ===
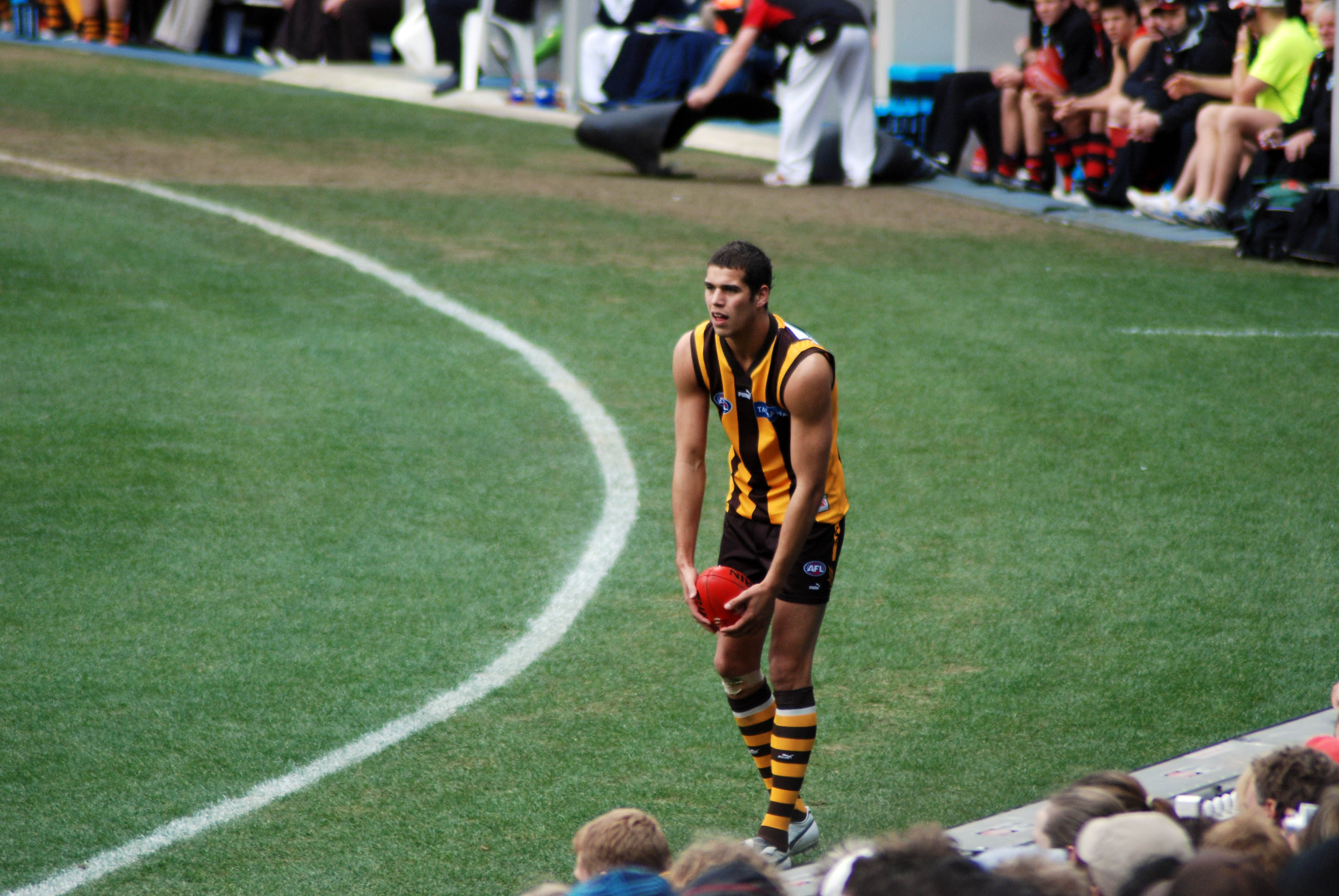
Lance Franklin played more AFL games and kicked more AFL goals than any other Western Australian footballer.

Graham 'Polly' Farmer was the first West Australian to be inducted into the Australian Football Hall of Fame as a legend. He was also named as the ruckman in the AFL Team of the Century. Barry Cable (2012) and Merv McIntosh (2021) have also been elevated to legend status.

Other great players from WA to have been inducted into the Australian Football Hall of Fame are Jack Clarke, George Doig, Ross Glendinning, Denis Marshall, Merv McIntosh, Stephen Michael, George Moloney, Graham Moss, Wayne Richardson, Jack Sheedy, William 'Nipper' Truscott and Bill Walker.

West Australians in the West Australian Hall of Fame Legends but not in the above (most likely due to limited involvement in the VFL) include: John Gerovich, Johnny Leonard, Phil Matson, Stan Heal, Steve Marsh and John Todd.

Retired modern VFL/AFL greats include Brad Hardie, Nicky Winmar, Jim and Phil Krakouer, Mark Bairstow, Glen Jakovich, Guy McKenna, Dean Kemp, Peter Sumich, Peter Matera, Shane Woewodin, Ben Cousins, Simon Black, Patrick Ryder, Peter Bell, Jeff Farmer, Aaron Sandilands, Dean Cox, Daniel Kerr, Lance Franklin and Nic Naitanui.

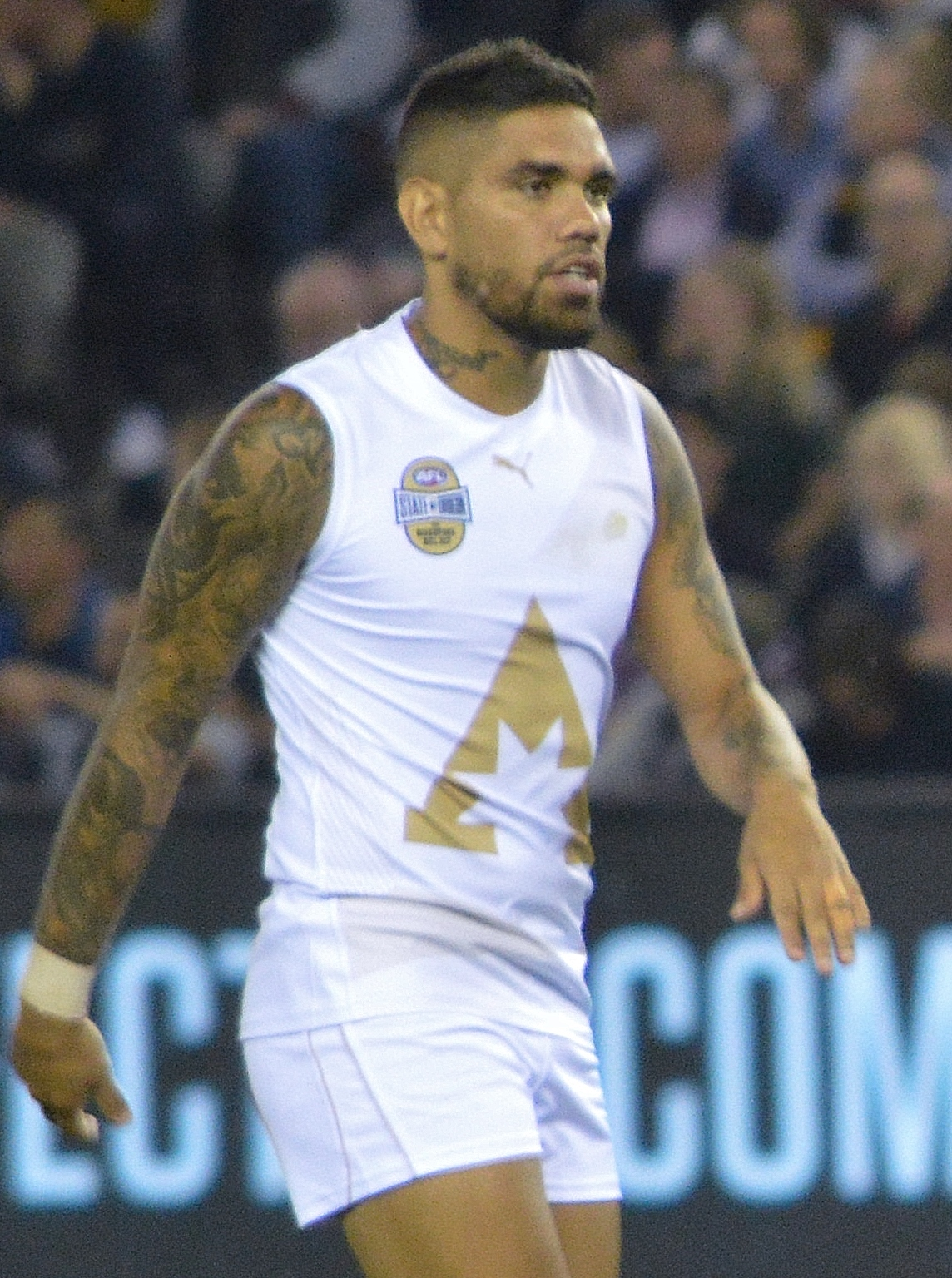
Michael Walters is from Perth

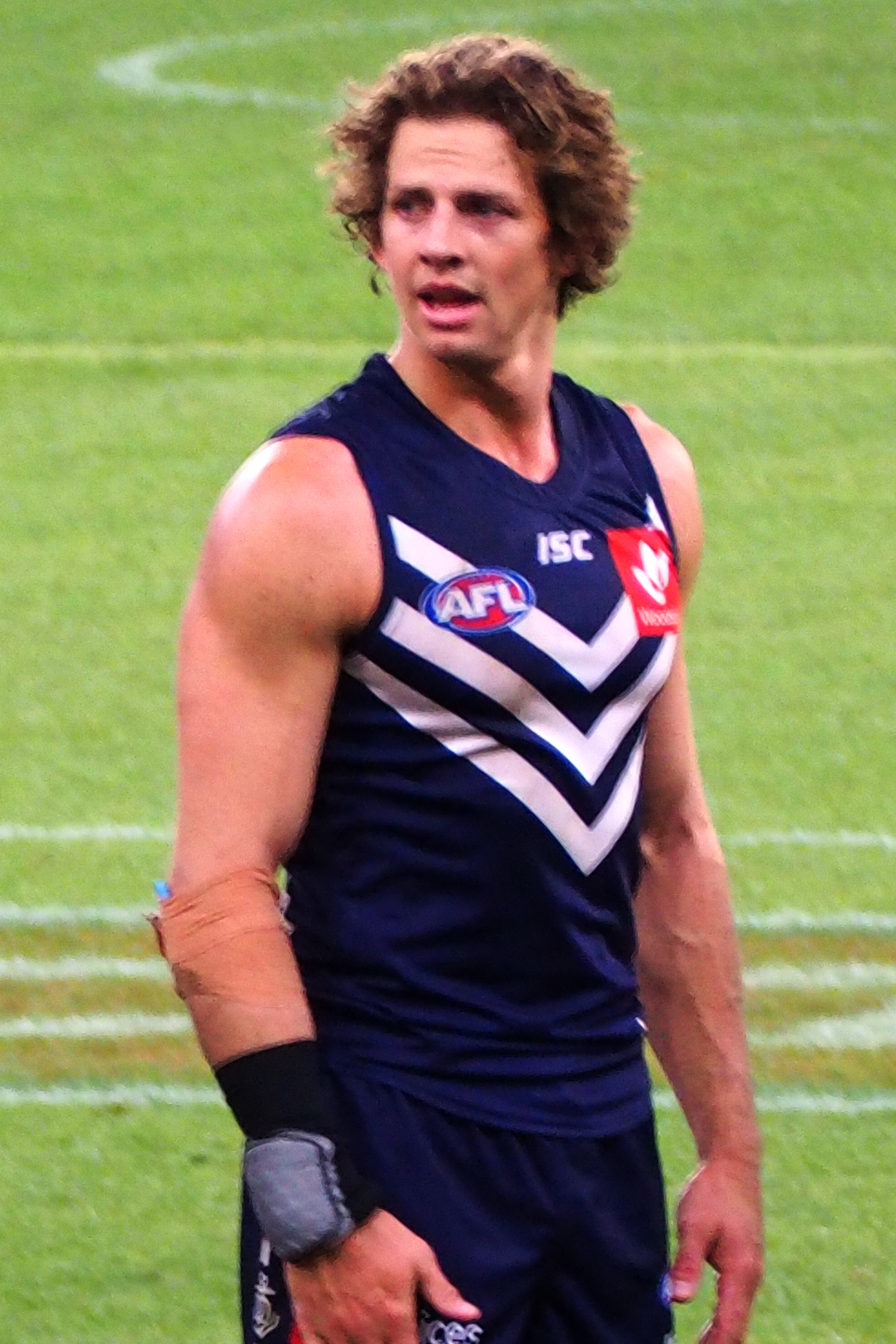
Nat Fyfe is from Lake Grace

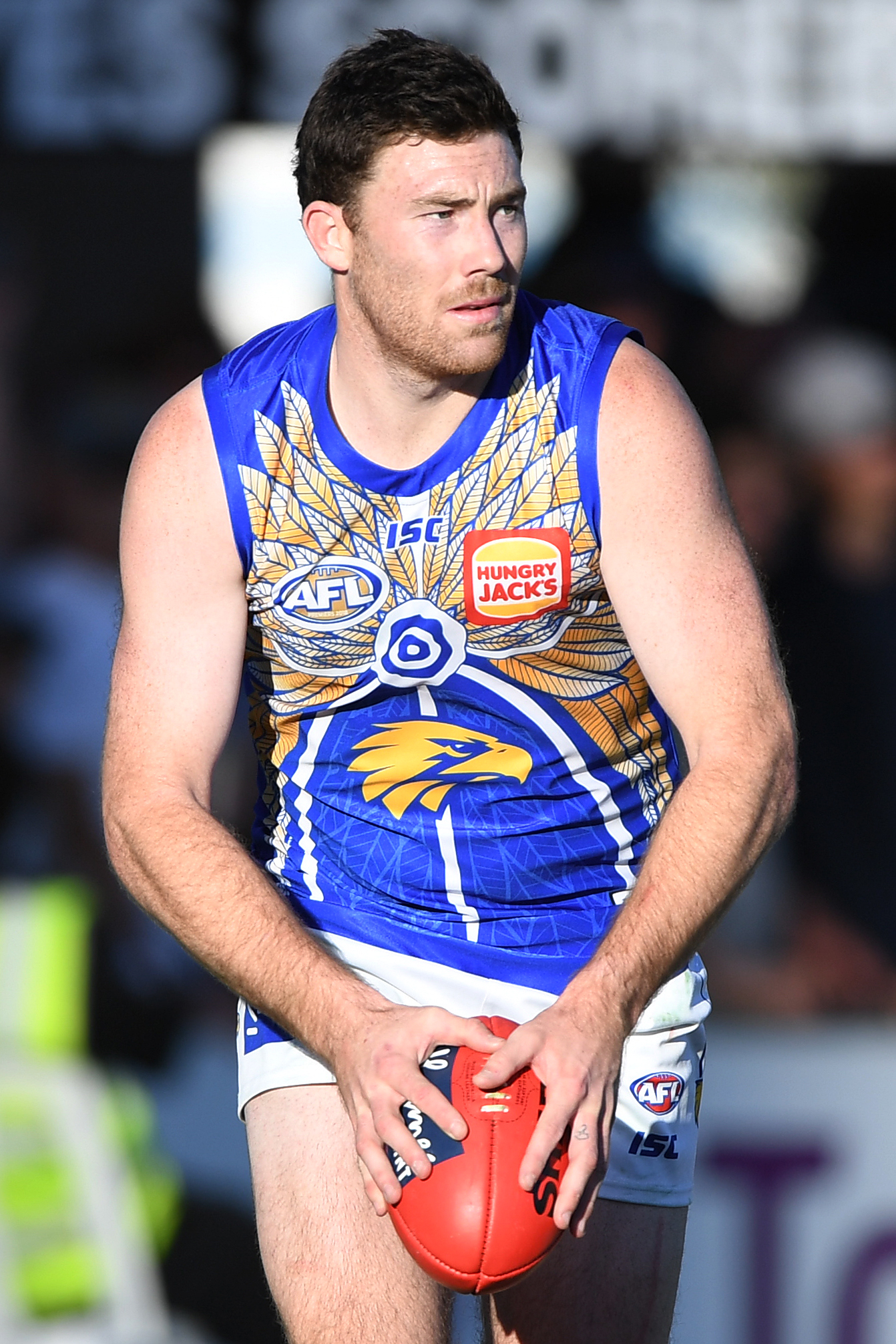
Jeremy McGovern is from Warburton

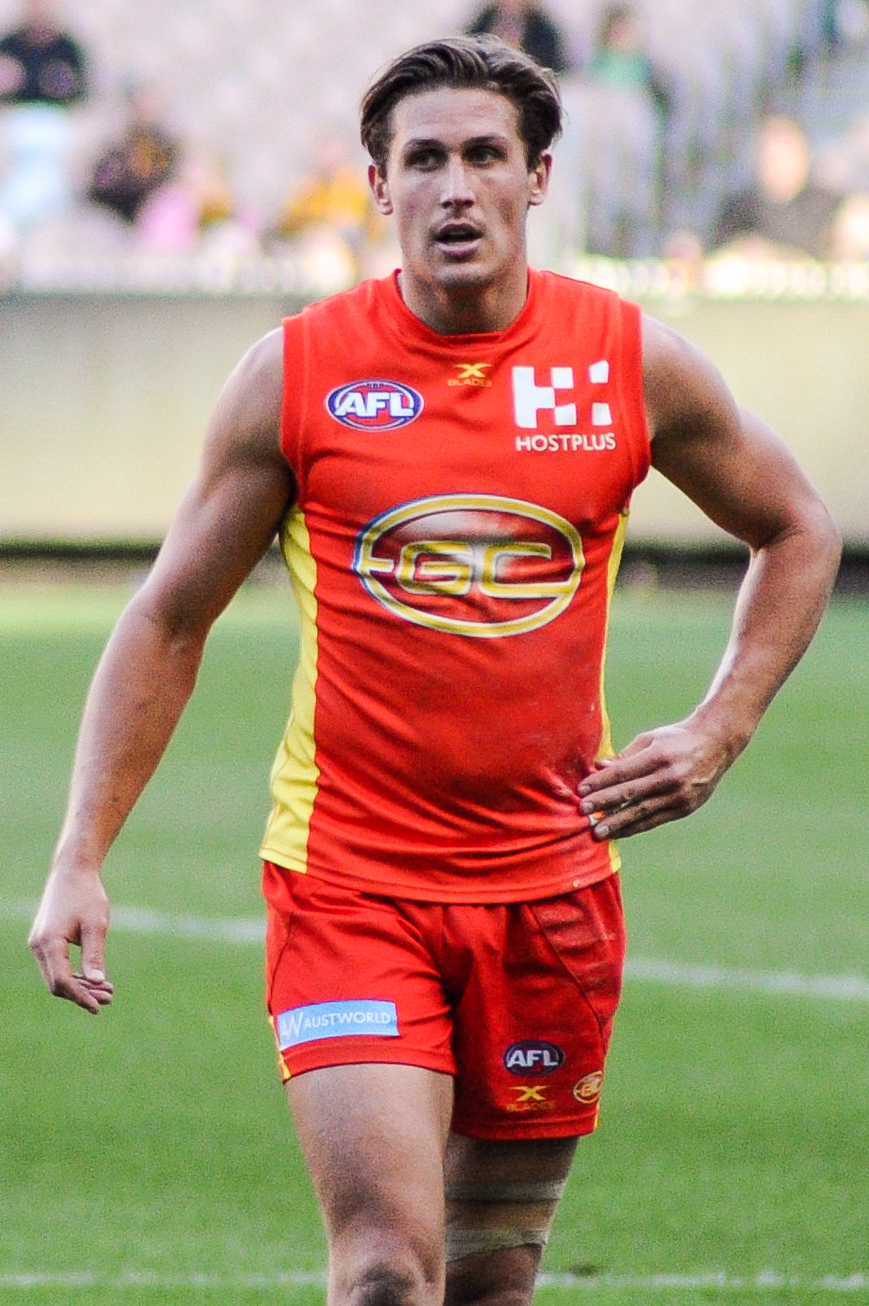
David Swallow is from Perth

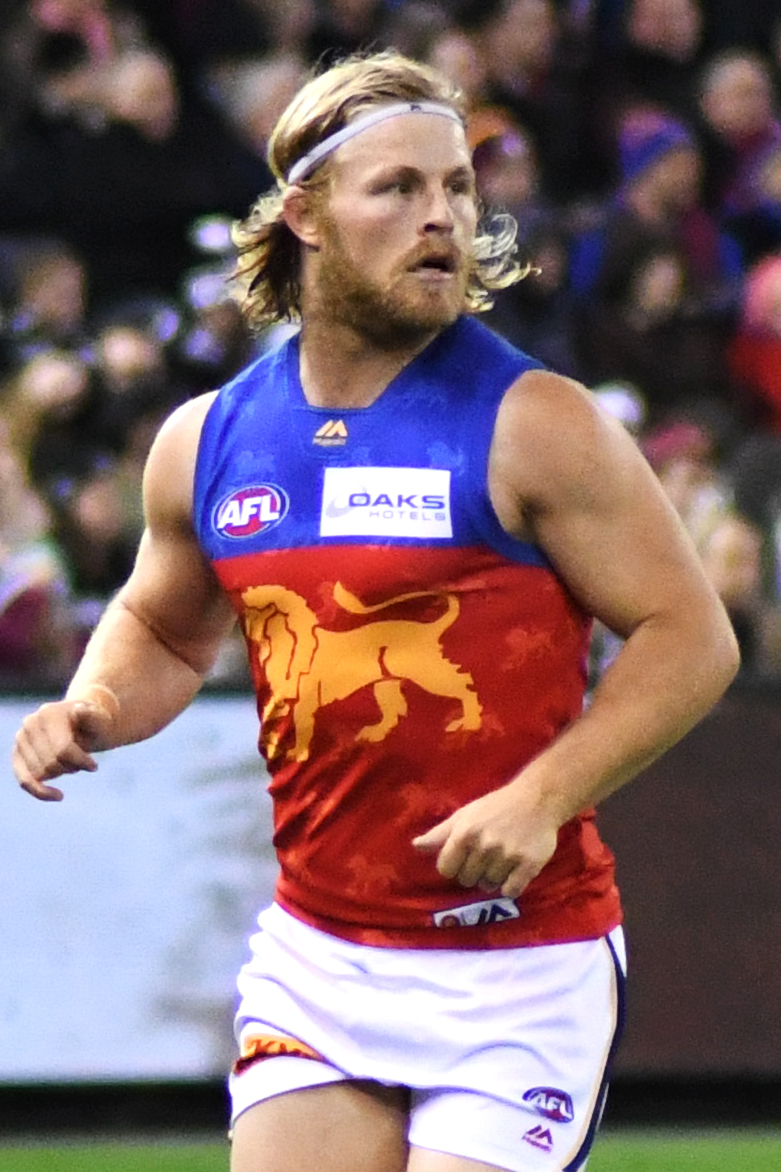
Daniel Rich is from Perth

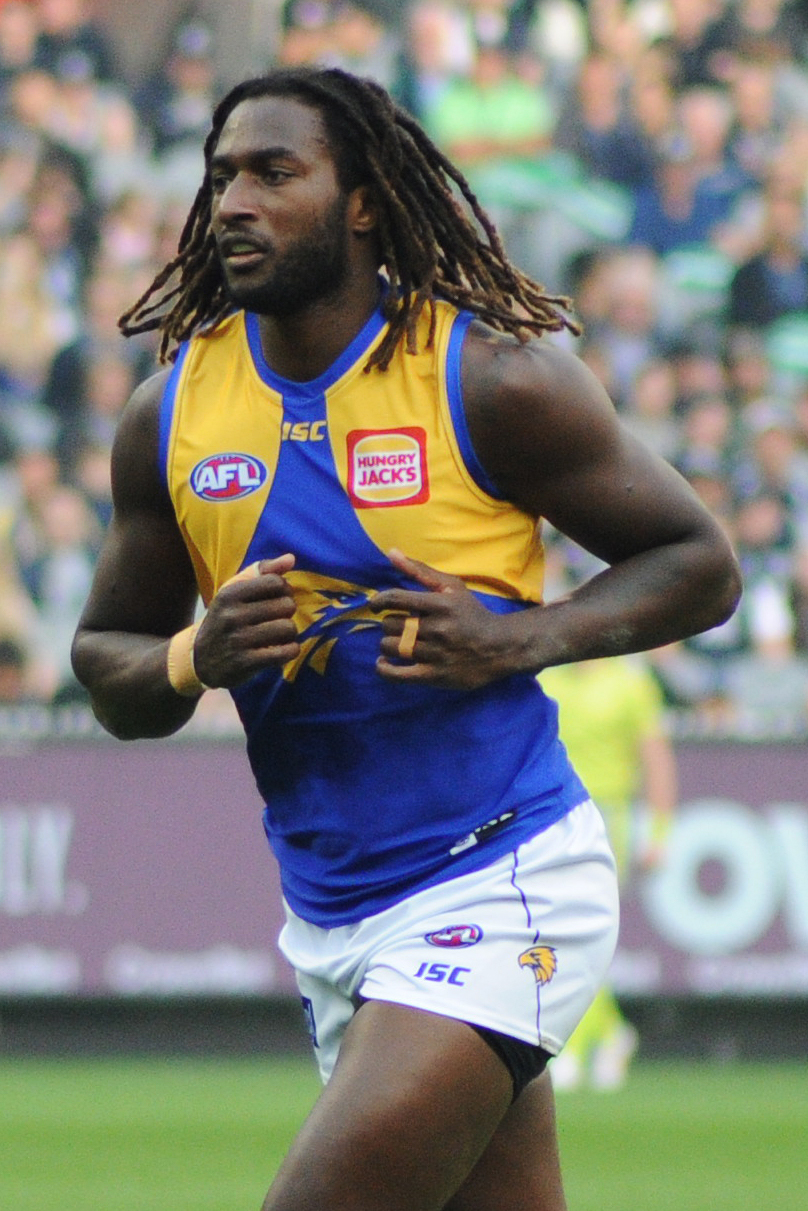
Nic Naitanui

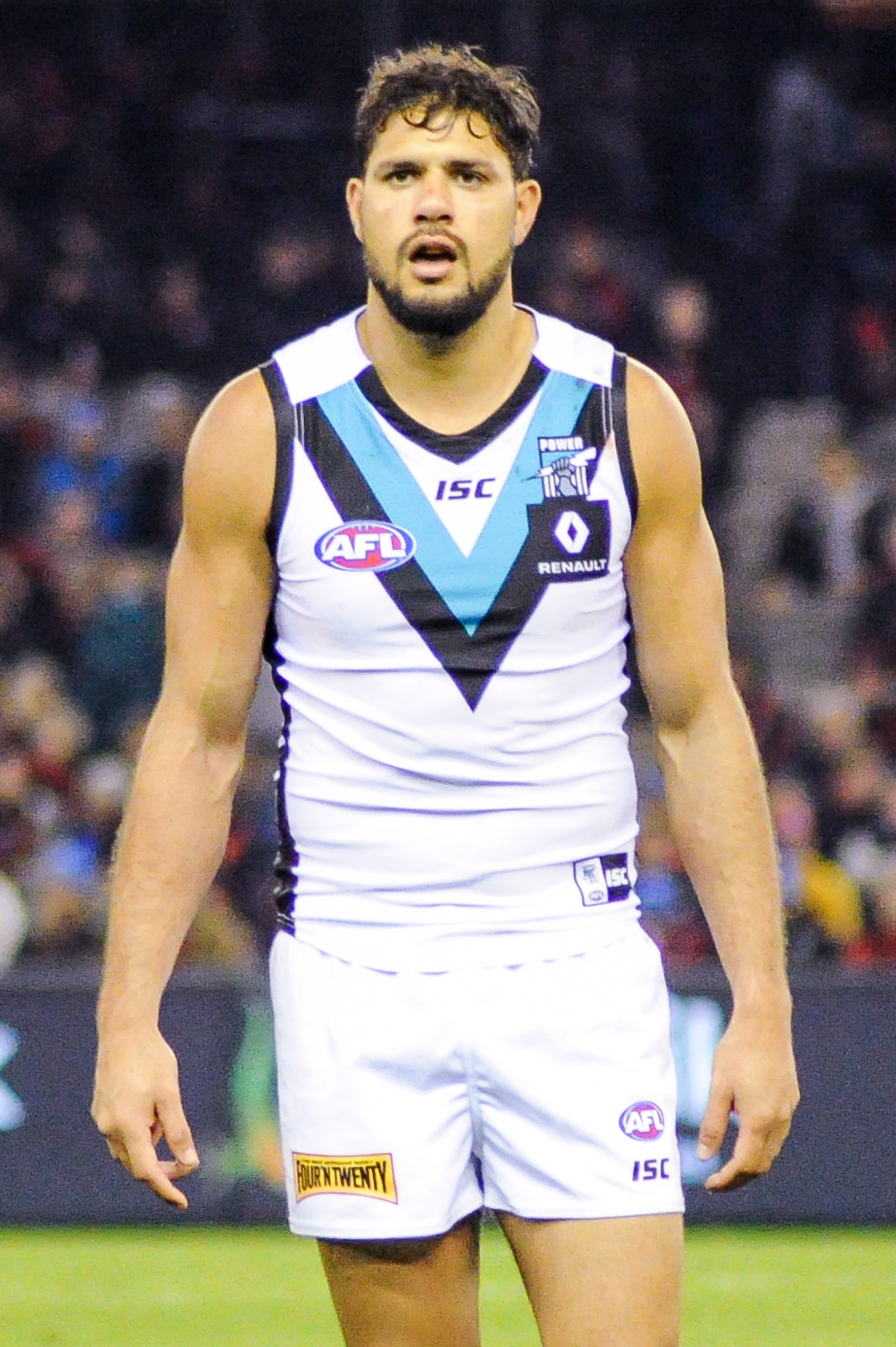
Patrick Ryder

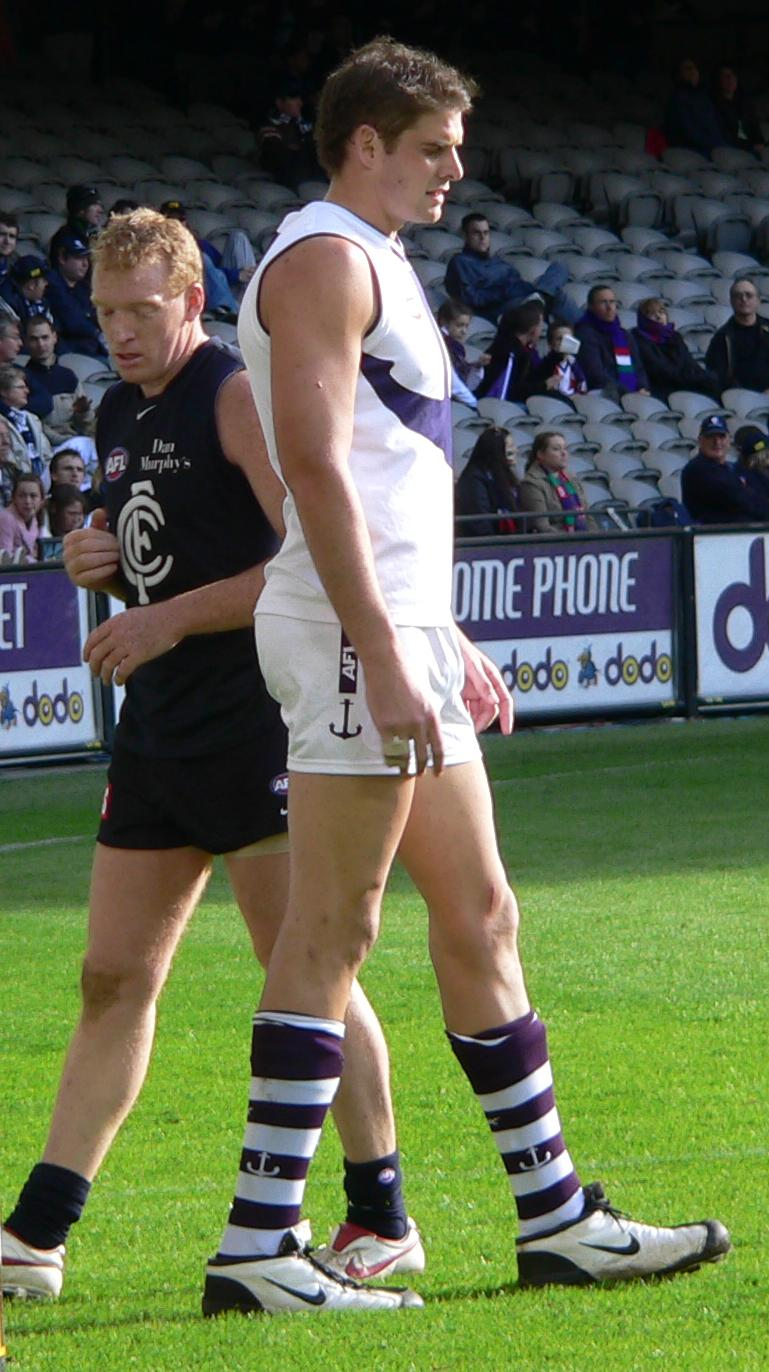
Aaron Sandilands

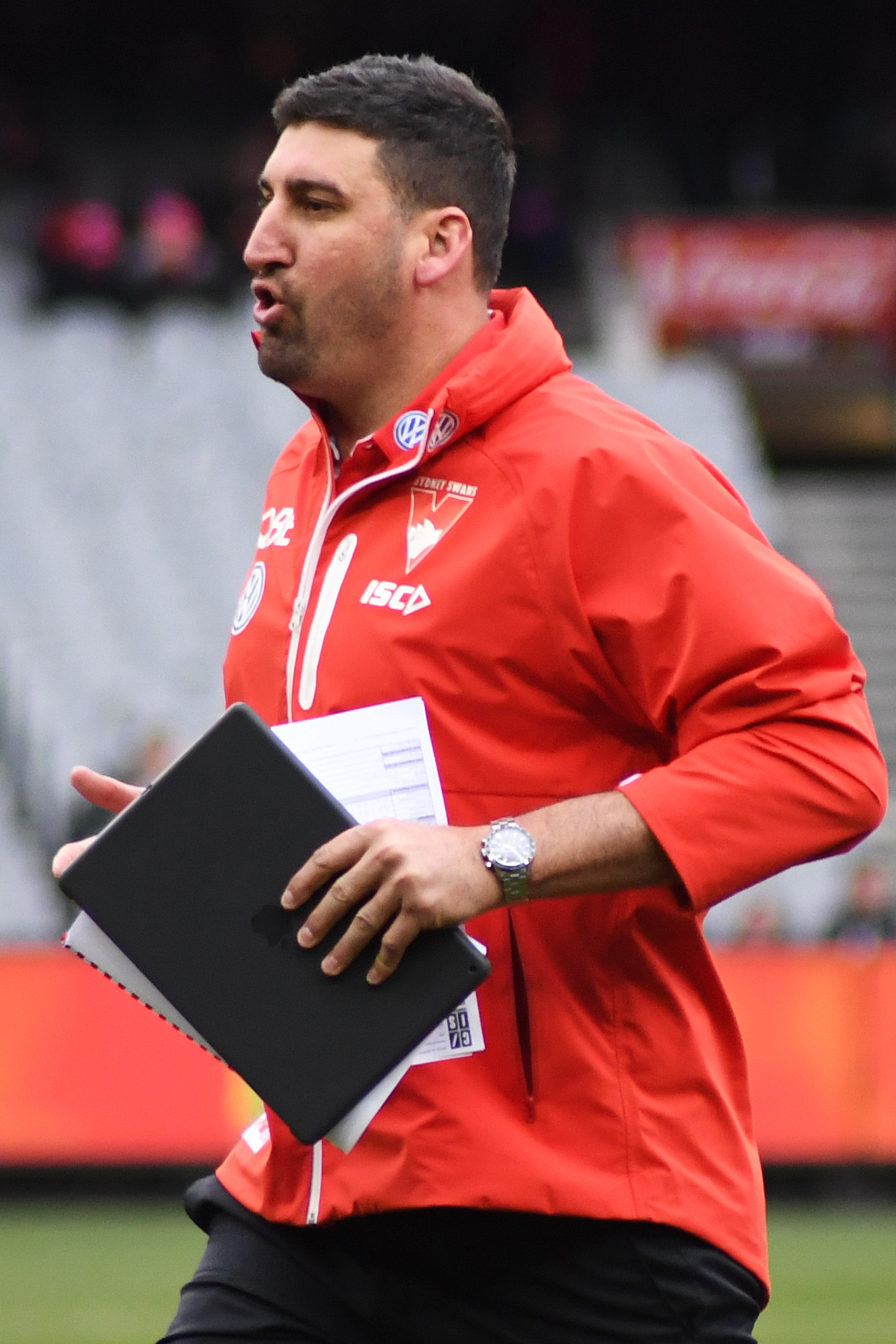
Dean Cox

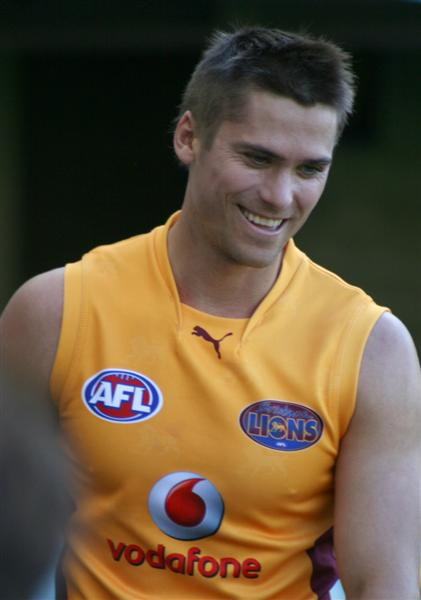
Simon Black

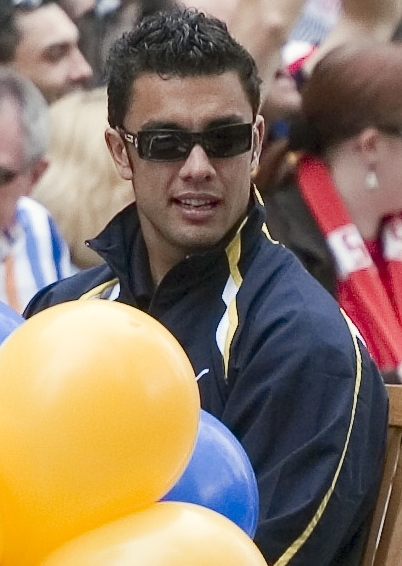
Daniel Kerr

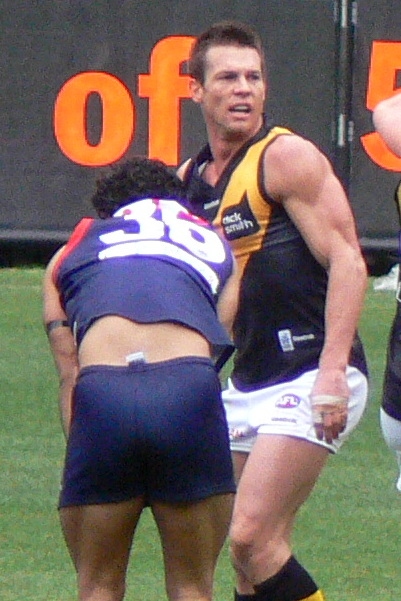
Ben Cousins

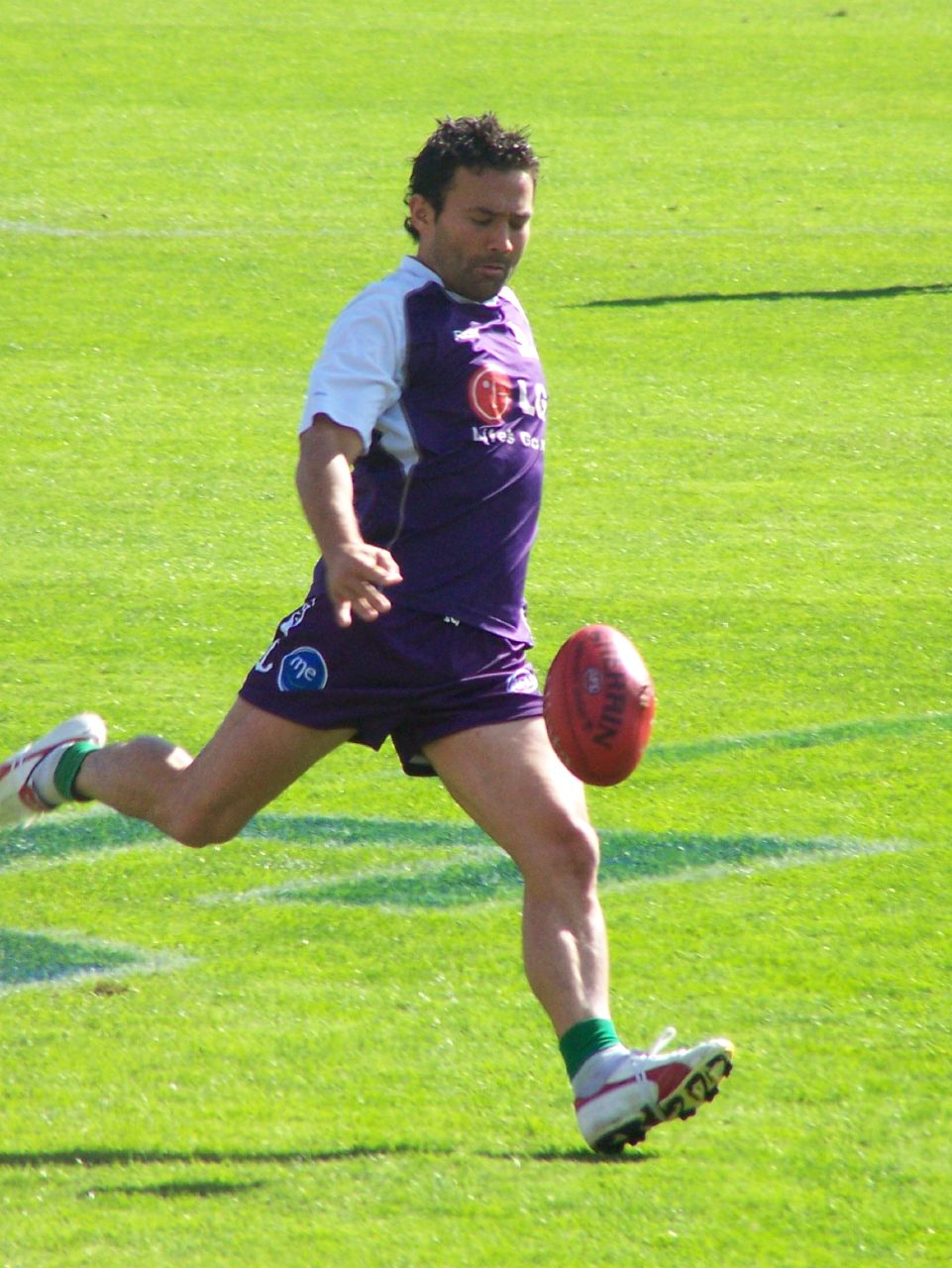
Peter Bell

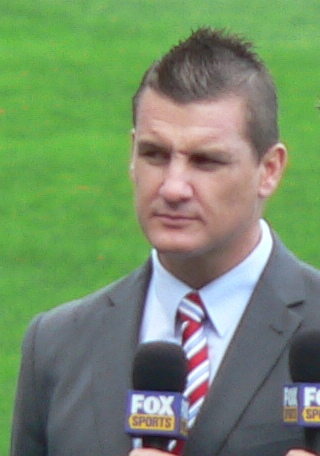
Glen Jakovich

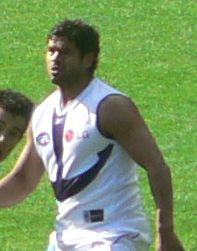
Jeff Farmer

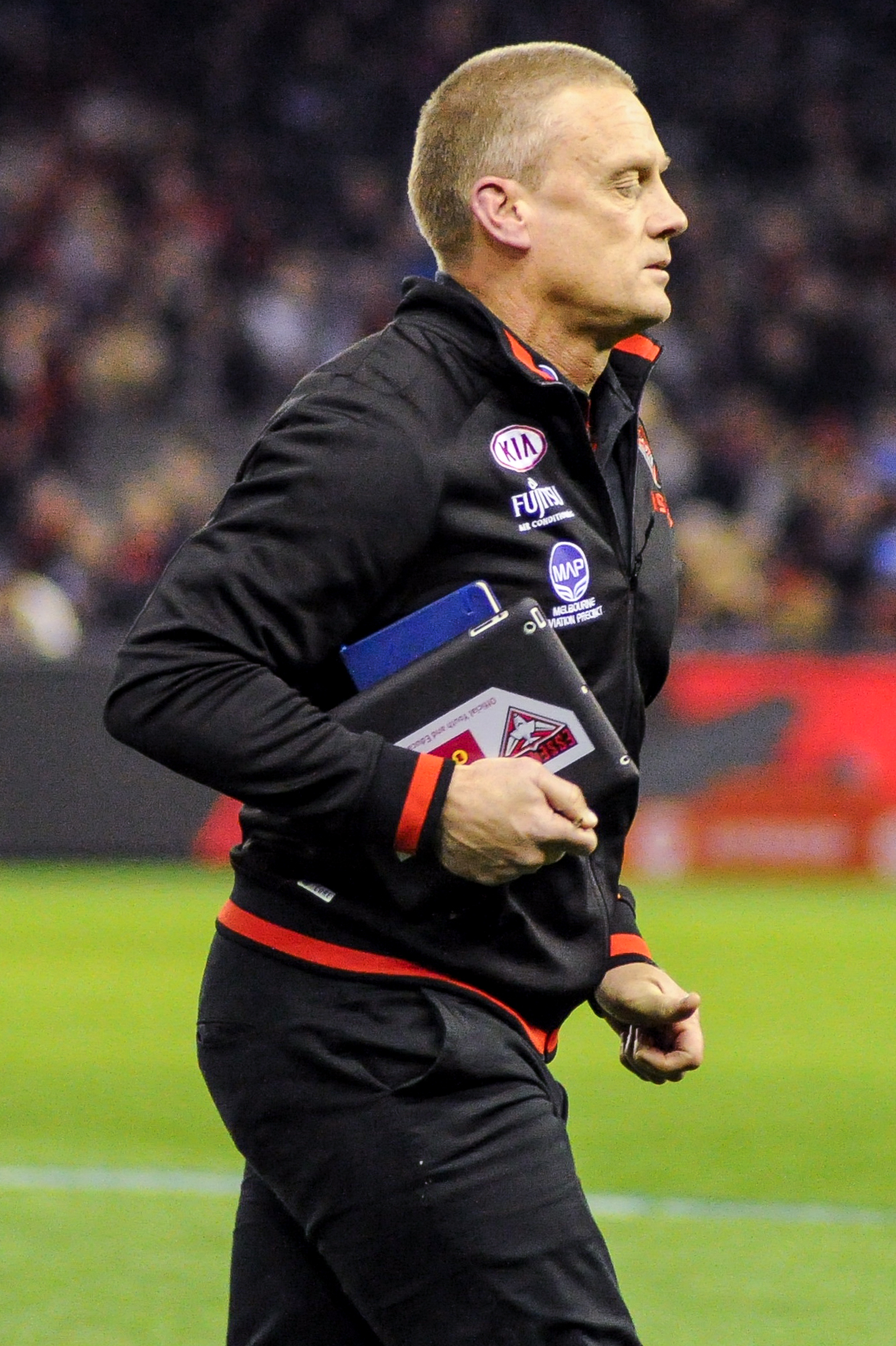
Guy McKenna

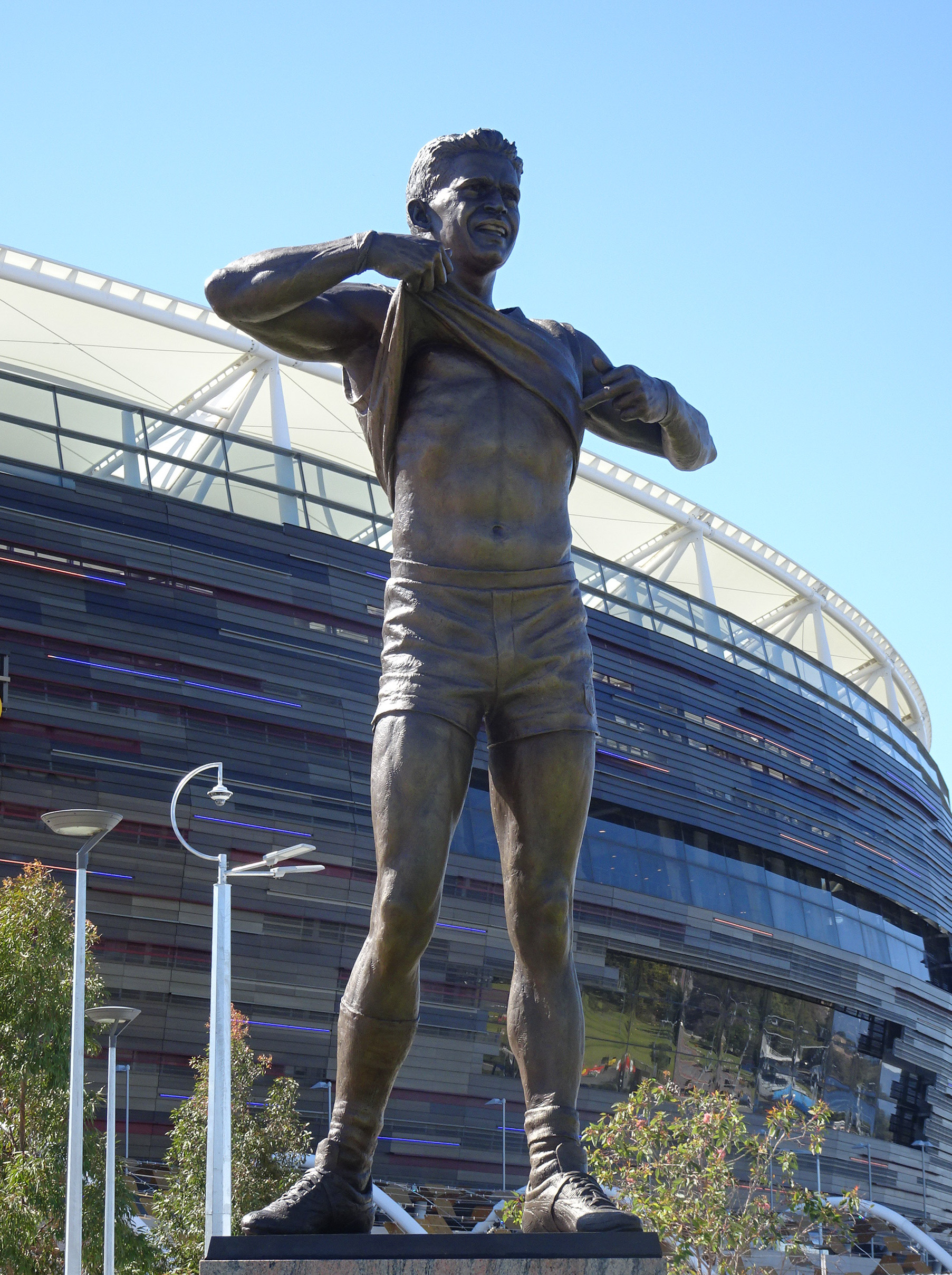
Nicky Winmar

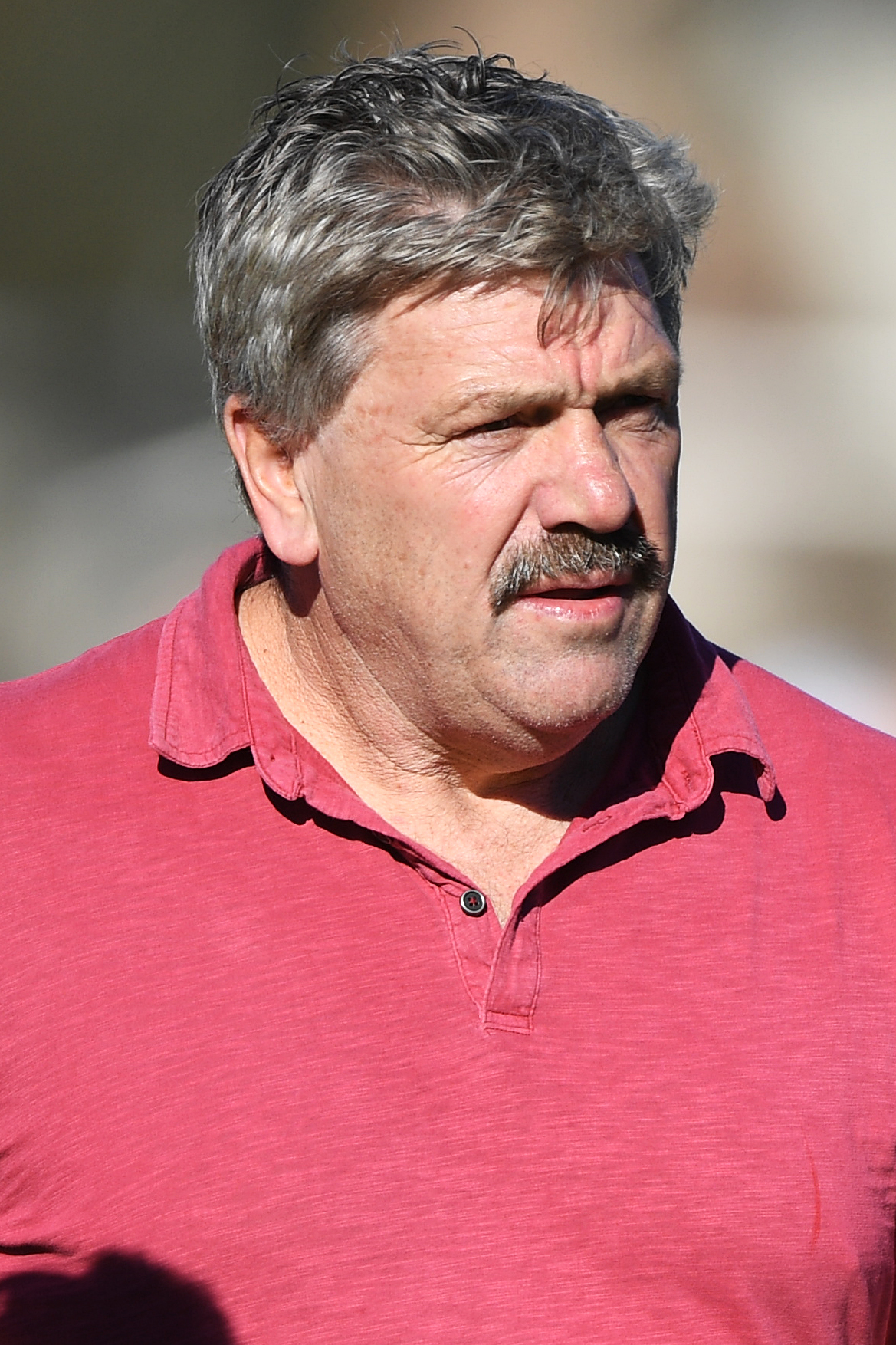
Brian Taylor

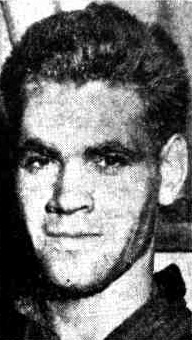
Graham 'Polly' Farmer

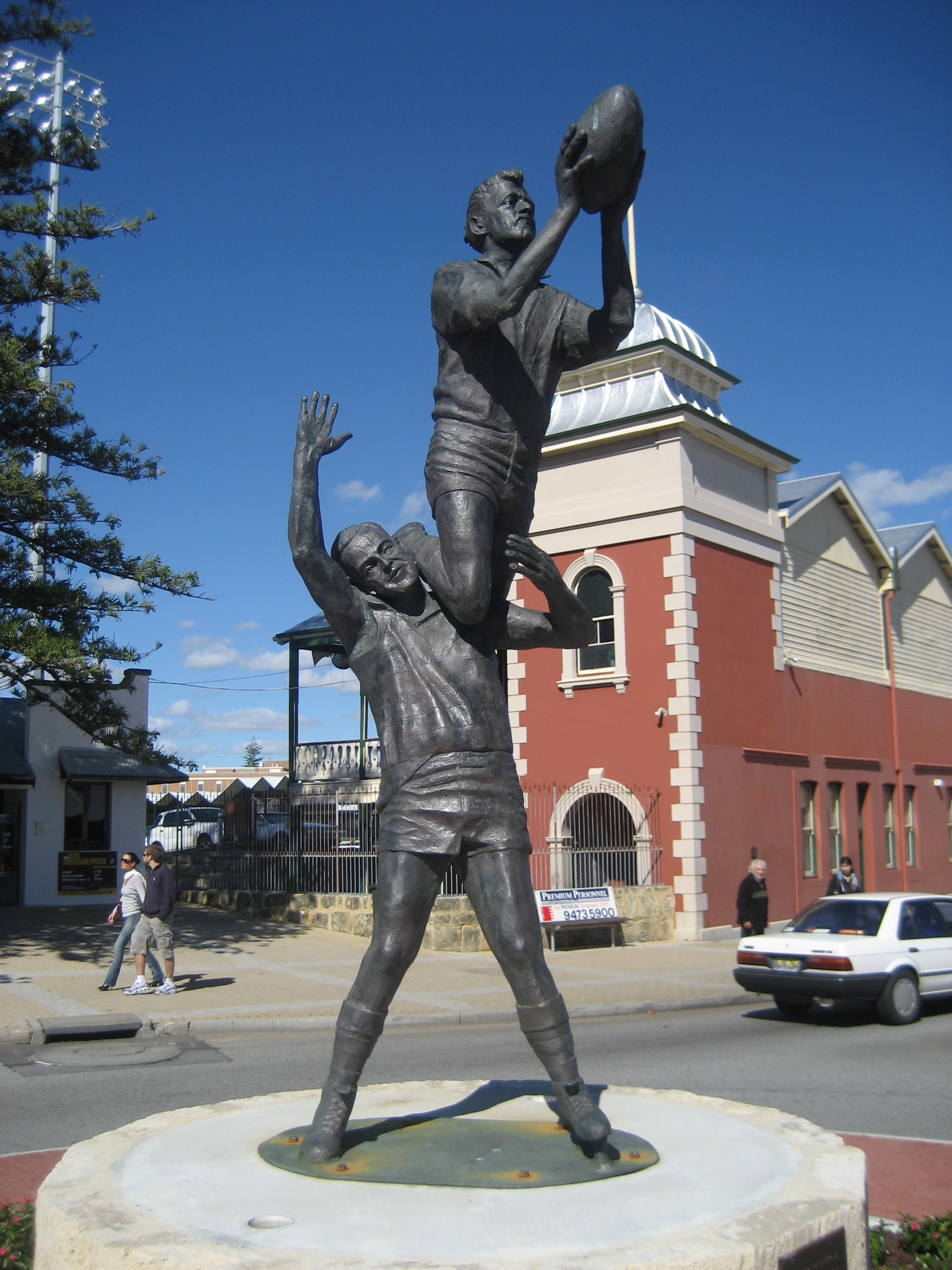
John Gerovich

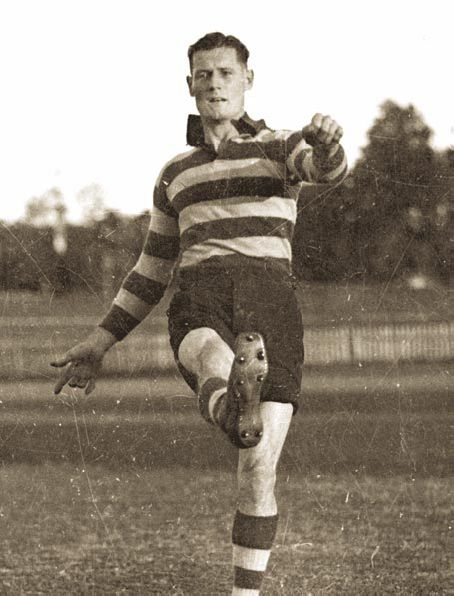
George Moloney

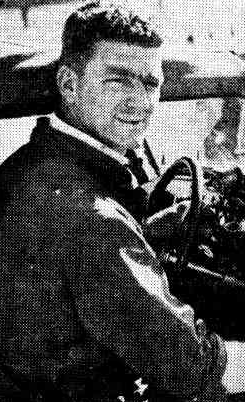
Merv McIntosh

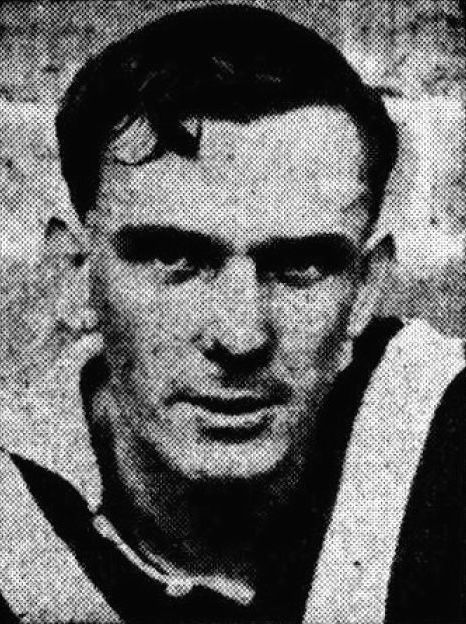
Steve Marsh

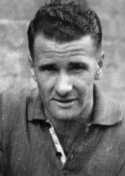
Stan Heal

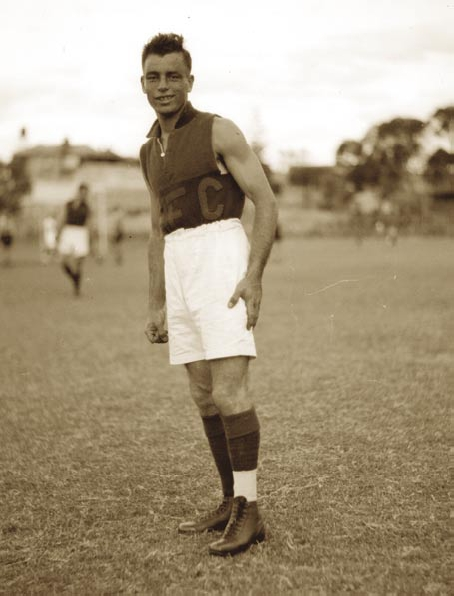
Johnny Leonard

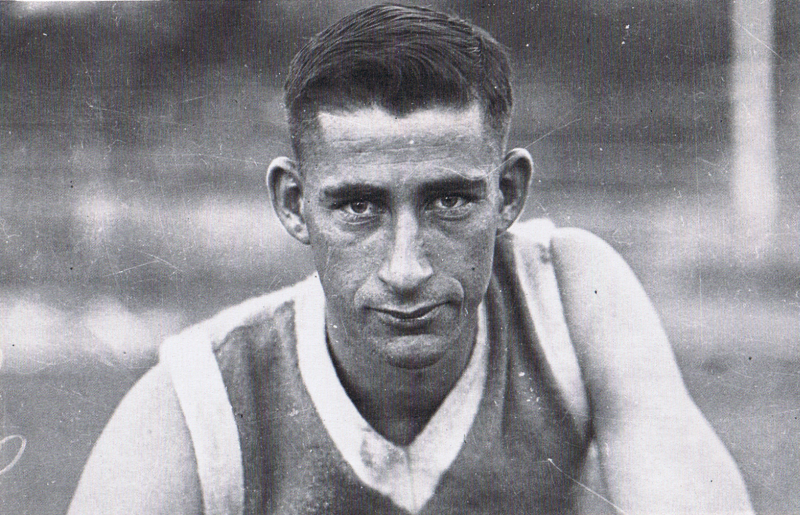
George Doig

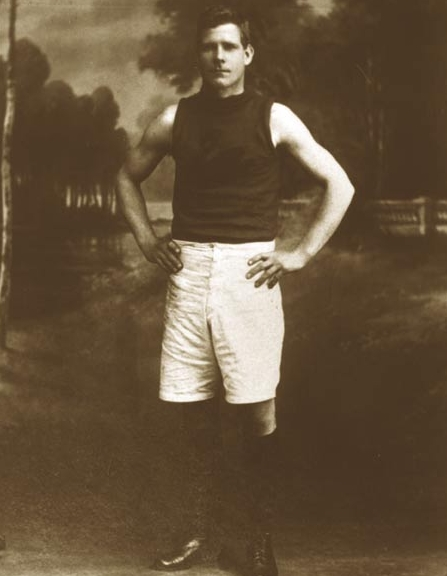
Phil Matson

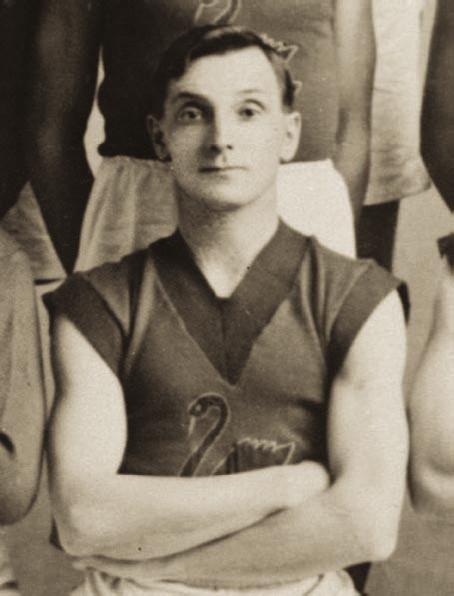
William "Nipper" Truscott

== See also ==
- West Australian Football League
- Australian Football League
- West Coast Eagles
- Fremantle Football Club
- List of Australian rules football leagues in Western Australia
- Australian rules football in the Goldfields region of Western Australia
- West Australian State Championship
