= Country Football WA =

- Sport: Australian rules football
- Jurisdiction: Western Australia
- Abbreviation: CFWA
- Founded: 1973; 52 years ago
- Regional affiliation: West Australian Football Commission
- Headquarters: Tuart Hill, Western Australia
- President: Mel Sulzberger (as of 2024)

Official website
- www.countryfootballwa.com.au

Country Football WA (CFWA) is the governing body for the sport of Australian rules football in the non-metropolitan areas of Western Australia. The organisation was founded in 1973 as the Western Australian National Country Football League (WANCFL) before becoming the West Australian Country Football League in 1979. The organisation rebranded to its current name in September 2023.

CFWA is also responsible for organising the Country Football Championships, contested annually between the various regional sides.

== Structure ==
The association is structured around eight Regional Football Development Councils which are responsible for assisting the development of the game in regional areas:

- Goldfields RFDC
- Great Southern RFDC
- Kimberley RFDC
- Midlands RFDC
- Mid West RFDC
- Pilbara RFDC
- South West RFDC
- Wheatbelt RFDC

Football leagues are associated individually with CFWA. As of 2012, there are 25 football leagues which fall under the association's authority:

- Avon Football Association
- Central Kimberley Football Association
- Central Midlands Coastal Football League
- Central Wheatbelt Football League
- East Kimberley Football Association
- Eastern Districts Football League
- Esperance District Football Association
- Fortescue National Football League
- Gascoyne Football Association
- Goldfields Football League
- Great Northern Football League
- Great Southern Football League
- Hills Football Association
- Lower South West Football League
- Mortlock Football League
- North Midlands Football League
- Newman National Football League
- North Pilbara Football League
- Ongerup Football Association
- Onshore Cup Football Association
- Peel Football League
- South West Football League
- Ravensthorpe & Districts Football Association
- Upper Great Southern Football League
- West Kimberley Football League

== Presidents ==
- 1973–91 "Bud" Byfield
- 1991–2001 John J. Lussick
- 2001–08 Ken Baxter
- 2008–18 Terry House
- 2018–present John Shadbolt
