= Newman National Football League =

- Sport: Australian rules football
- First season: 1972
- No. of teams: 4
- Most recent champion: Tigers (16) (2026)
- Most titles: Saints (20)
- Website: www.nnfl.sportingpulse.net

The Newman National Football League, named after the mining centre of Newman, Western Australia, is an Australian rules football competition based in the Pilbara region of Western Australia.

== History ==
The league was founded in 1972 with three clubs, Centrals, Saints and Tigers. in 1975 a fourth club Pioneers joined the competition. All games are played at the Capricorn Oval on Fortescue Avenue, Newman.

The league is affiliated with the West Australian Football Commission through the Western Australian Country Football League. Pioneers are the reigning premier after defeating Tigers, 12.7 (79) to 3.8 (26), in the 2025 Grand Final.

=== Clubs ===
Club	Colours	Nickname	Est.	Years in NFNL	NNFL Premierships	
Club	Colours	Nickname	Est.	Years in NFNL	Total	Years
Centrals		Lions	1972	1972-	8	1972, 1976, 1979, 1992, 1994, 1995, 2010, 2012
Pioneers		Demons	1975	1975-	10	1980, 1981, 1982, 1983, 1984, 2002, 2022, 2023, 2024, 2025
Saints		Saints	1972	1972-	20	1973, 1974, 1978, 1986, 1988, 1990, 1997, 1999, 2000, 2001, 2003, 2004, 2006, 2014, 2015, 2016, 2017, 2018, 2019, 2021
Tigers		Tigers	1972	1972-	16	1975, 1977, 1985, 1987, 1989, 1991, 1993, 1996, 1998, 2005, 2007, 2008, 2009, 2011, 2013, 2026

== NNFL Fairest and Best & Leading Goal Kicker Awards ==
Sir Ian McLennan Medallist	Club	Year	Dearlove Leading Goalkicker	Goals	Club
Bill Knox	Centrals	1972	Wally (Bell) Kowalczuk	28	Tigers
Ron Willison	Saints	1973	Wally Kowalczuk	27	Centrals
Bill Knox	Centrals	1974	Rennie Zammit		Centrals
Peter Sattell	Centrals	1975	Roy Litherland	24	Saints
Ron Willison	Saints	1976	Wayne Reynolds	24	Centrals
Wayne Reynolds	Centrals	1977	Kelvin Payne		Saints
Phil Noble	Saints	1978	Callen		Saints
Phil Noble	Saints	1979	Phil Taylor	37	Pioneers
Dave Fulton	Saints	1980	Ian Rennie	50	Tigers
Phil Noble	Saints	1981			
Peter Gregory	Saints	1982			
Jim Gardiner	Centrals	1983	Geoff Coombs		Pioneers
Peter Gregory	Saints	1984	Geoff Coombs		Pioneers
Alan Whyborn	Pioneers	1985	Geoff Coombs		Pioneers
Jim Gardiner	Centrals	1986	Norm Uncle	108	Saints
Ian Crawford	Tigers	1987	Ian Crawford	130	Tigers
Jim Gardiner	Centrals	1988	Peter Walker	43	Saints
Peter Walker	Saints	1989	Peter Walker	49	Saints
Greg Haines	Tigers	1990	Wayne Mansell		Tigers
R. Studham	Tigers	1991			
Ian Wolfenden	Saints	1992	Ron Adams		Pioneers
Ian Wolfenden	Saints	1993			
Peter Kay; Steve Cooper	Tigers; Centrals	1994			
Steve Cooper; Neil Clark	Centrals; Saints	1995	Neil Clark		Saints
Brett Austin	Tigers	1996			
Brian Dhu	Saints	1997			
Jay Jay Abbott	Saints	1998	Brett Austin		Tigers
Mark Austin	Tigers	1999	Dave Cocodis		Pioneers
Jay Jay Abbott	Saints	2000	P. Pirrottina		Pioneers
Nathan Lawyer	Pioneers	2001	Neil Clark		Saints
Evan Carroll	Tigers	2002	Scott Parke		Tigers
Justin Williams	Pioneers	2003	Scott Parke	31	Tigers
Joel Yates	Centrals	2004	Greg Councillor	64	Saints
Mark Lincoln	Saints	2005	Daniel Large	36	Saints
Morgan Tucker	Saints	2006	Scott Parke	63	Tigers
Dean Carroll	Tigers	2007	Owen Walpole	56	Tigers
Brian McKendry	Tigers	2008	Paul Johnston	46	Tigers
Evan Carroll	Tigers	2009	Paul Johnston	50	Tigers
Rob Ryan	Tigers	2010	Aydan Hoyer	48	Centrals
Terrence Gilla	Pioneers	2011	Mark Taranto	35	Pioneers
Evan Carroll	Tigers	2012	Brett Norton	84	Centrals
Murray Smith	Tigers	2013	Brett Norton	49	Saints
Anthony Taylor	Centrals	2014	Anthony Hansen	43	Centrals
Sachin Barr	Saints	2015	Nathan Ramsey	38	Saints
Jarrod Mason	Saints	2016	Nathan Ramsey	39	Saints
Jarrod Mason	Saints	2017	Nathan Ramsey	47	Saints
Corey Rota; Kade Tucker	Tigers; Saints	2018	Glen Champion	55	Tigers
Dillan Jones	Saints	2019	Daine Hart	43	Centrals

== 2009 ladder ==
Newman	Wins	Byes	Losses	Draws	For	Against	%	Pts
Tigers	12	0	3	0	1805	878	205.58%	48
Centrals	12	0	3	0	1712	1060	161.51%	48
Pioneers	4	0	11	0	1203	1656	72.64%	16
Saints	2	0	13	0	819	1945	42.11%	8

Finals

Final	Team	G	B	Pts	Team	G	B	Pts
Preliminary	Centrals	18	5	113	Pioneers	11	13	79
Grand	Tigers	13	12	90	Centrals	9	16	70

== 2010 ladder ==
Newman	Wins	Byes	Losses	Draws	For	Against	%	Pts
Centrals	15	0	0	0	1998	714	279.83%	60
Saints	7	0	8	0	1169	1241	94.20%	28
Tigers	6	0	9	0	1110	1074	103.35%	24
Pioneers	2	0	13	0	610	1858	32.83%	8

Finals

Final	Team	G	B	Pts	Team	G	B	Pts
Preliminary	Tigers	9	15	69	Saints	9	4	58
Grand	Centrals	10	14	74	Tigers	10	9	69

== 2011 ladder ==
Newman	Wins	Byes	Losses	Draws	For	Against	%	Pts
Tigers	9	0	5	1	1364	1077	126.65%	38
Pioneers	7	0	8	0	1324	1268	104.42%	28
Centrals	7	0	8	0	1168	1365	85.57%	28
Saints	6	0	8	1	1048	1194	87.77%	26

Finals

Final	Team	G	B	Pts	Team	G	B	Pts
Preliminary	Pioneers	20	16	136	Centrals	11	11	77
Grand	Tigers	17	15	117	Pioneers	14	13	97

== 2013 ladder ==
Newman	Wins	Byes	Losses	Draws	For	Against	%	Pts	Final	Team	G	B	Pts	Team	G	B	Pts
Centrals	15	0	0	0	2204	688	320.35%	60	Preliminary	Saints	22	17	149	Tigers	4	7	31
Saints	9	0	6	0	1797	1133	158.61%	36	Grand	Saints	15	7	97	Centrals	12	13	85
Tigers	3	0	12	0	1074	1727	62.19%	12									
Pioneers	3	0	12	0	734	2261	32.46%	12									

== 2014 ladder ==
Newman	Wins	Byes	Losses	Draws	For	Against	%	Pts	Final	Team	G	B	Pts	Team	G	B	Pts
Saints	9	0	3	0	1014	411	246.72%	36	Preliminary	Tigers	11	11	77	Centrals	10	4	64
Tigers	8	0	4	0	796	626	127.16%	32	Grand	Saints	14	7	91	Tigers	6	8	44
Centrals	6	0	6	0	632	672	94.05%	24									
Pioneers	1	0	11	0	364	1097	33.18%	4									

== 2015 ladder ==
Newman	Wins	Byes	Losses	Draws	For	Against	%	Pts	Final	Team	G	B	Pts	Team	G	B	Pts
Saints	9	0	3	0	1076	477	225.58%	36	Preliminary	Centrals	8	9	57	Tigers	7	6	48
Tigers	7	0	5	0	941	680	138.38%	28	Grand	Saints	12	12	84	Centrals	4	8	32
Centrals	5	0	7	0	497	1080	46.02%	20									
Pioneers	3	0	9	0	589	866	68.01%	12									

== 2016 ladder ==
Newman	Wins	Byes	Losses	Draws	For	Against	%	Pts	Final	Team	G	B	Pts	Team	G	B	Pts
Saints	15	0	0	0	1452	525	276.57%	60	Preliminary	Pioneers	12	4	76	Tigers	3	7	25
Pioneers	8	0	7	0	954	951	100.32%	32	Grand	Saints	11	9	75	Pioneers	7	5	47
Tigers	5	0	10	0	751	989	75.94%	20									
Centrals	2	0	13	0	605	1297	46.65%	8									

== 2018 ladder ==
Newman	Wins	Byes	Losses	Draws	For	Against	%	Pts	Final	Team	G	B	Pts	Team	G	B	Pts
Tigers	12	0	3	0	1460	714	204.48%	48	Preliminary	Saints	12	10	82	Pioneers	7	5	47
Saints	10	0	5	0	1465	855	171.35%	40	Grand	Saints	10	6	66	Tigers	7	7	49
Pioneers	6	0	9	0	1003	1254	79.98%	24									
Centrals	2	0	13	0	644	1749	36.82%	8									

== 2019 ladder ==
Newman	Wins	Byes	Losses	Draws	For	Against	%	Pts	Final	Team	G	B	Pts	Team	G	B	Pts
Pioneers	9	0	5	1	948	911	104.06%	38									
Saints	7	0	7	1	1014	988	102.63%	30									
Centrals	7	0	8	0	1114	1013	109.97%	28	Preliminary	Saints	10	10	70	Centrals	5	7	37
Tigers	6	0	9	0	937	1101	85.10%	24	Grand	Saints	8	12	60	Pioneers	7	8	50
