= Central Midlands Coastal Football League =

Central Midlands Coastal Football League
Established	1992
Teams	5
2026 premiers	Cervantes
Most premierships	Cervantes (21)

The Central Midlands Coastal Football League is an Australian rules football league in Western Australia, with clubs situated in the northern wheatbelt and on the coast north of Perth. It was founded in 1992 through the merger of the Coastal Football Association and Central Midlands Football League.

== Clubs ==
=== Locations ===
Locations of the 2025 Central Midlands Coastal FL clubs

=== Current ===
Club	Colours	Nickname	Home ground	Former League	Est.	Years in CMCFL	Premierships	
Club	Colours	Nickname	Home ground	Former League	Est.	Years in CMCFL	Total	Years
Cervantes		Tiger Sharks	Cervantes Oval, Cervantes	CFA	1983	1992–	21	1995, 1998, 1999, 2000, 2001, 2003, 2004, 2005, 2006, 2008, 2009, 2010, 2011, 2012, 2013, 2015, 2016, 2018, 2019, 2022, 2026
Dandaragan		Saints	Dandaragan Town Oval, Dandaragan	CMFL	1968	1992–2001, 2003–	4	1994, 2007, 2024, 2025
Jurien Bay		Bulldogs	Jurien Bay Oval, Jurien Bay	CFA	1973	1992–2001, 2003–	3	1996, 2017, 2023
Lancelin-Ledge Point		Pirates	Lancelin Sporting Complex, Lancelin	–	1995	2009–	2	2014, 2021
Moora		Mavericks	Moora Recreation Reserve, Moora	–	2013	2013–	0	-

=== Former ===
Club	Colours	Nickname	Home ground	Former League	Est.	Years in CMCFL	Premierships		Fate
Club	Colours	Nickname	Home ground	Former League	Est.	Years in CMCFL	Total	Years	Fate
Bindi-Miling		Bombers	Miling Sports Ground, Miling	CMFL	c.1977	1992–2004	2	1993, 1997	Folded in 2004
Leeman		Marlins	Wann Park Oval, Leeman	CFA	1972	1992–2001, 2004–2008	0	-	Recess from 2002-2003. Folded in 2008
Moora Rovers		Demons	Moora Recreation Reserve, Moora	CMFL	1920	1992–2012	0	-	Merged with Moora Warriors to form Moora Mavericks after 2012 season.
Moora Warriors	(1980s)(?-2012)	Warriors	Moora Recreation Reserve, Moora	CMFL	c.1946	1992–2009, 2012	2	1992, 2002	Recess from 2010-2011. Merged with Moora Rovers to form Moora Mavericks after 2012 season.
Watheroo		Roos	Watheroo Sports Ground, Watheroo	CMFL	1948	1992–2004	0	-	Folded in 2004

== Grand final results ==
Year	Premiers	Score	Runners up	Score
1992	Moora Warriors	19.14 (128)	Bindi-Miling	14.8 (92)
1993	Bindi Miling		Dandaragan	
1994	Dandaragan	13.6 (84)	Bindi-Miling	9.8 (62)
1995	Cervantes	27.7 (169)	Jurien Bay	14.9 (93)
1996	Jurien Bay	13.7 (85)	Bindi-Miling	12.5 (77)
1997	Bindi Miling	19.14 (128)	Jurien Bay	9.13 (67)
1998	Cervantes	21.16 (142)	Moora Rovers	9.7 (61)
1999	Cervantes	13.10 (88)	Moora Rovers	10.9 (69)
2000	Cervantes	11.24 (90)	Moora Rovers	9.6 (60)
2001	Cervantes	13.11 (89)	Watheroo	9.6 (60)
2002	Moora Warriors	22.8 (140)	Moora Rovers	18.8 (116)
2003	Cervantes	22.13 (145)	Bindi Miling	9.9 (63)
2004	Cervantes	14.12 (96)	Dandaragan	6.4 (40)
2005	Cervantes	17.14 (116)	Dandaragan	11.11 (77)
2006	Cervantes	14.12 (96)	Dandaragan	12.10 (82)
2007	Dandaragan	13.11 (89)	Jurien Bay	12.7 (79)
2008	Cervantes	14.10 (94)	Jurien Bay	11.9 (75)
2009	Cervantes	19.15 (129)	Dandaragan	9.6 (60)
2010	Cervantes	17.13 (115)	Dandaragan	12.16 (88)
2011	Cervantes	15.21 (111)	Jurien Bay	3.4 (22)
2012	Cervantes	20.12 (132)	Jurien Bay	11.12 (78)
2013	Cervantes	10.15 (75)	Lancelin-Ledge Point	9.6 (60)
2014	Lancelin-Ledge Point	10.13 (73)	Cervantes	9.15 (69)
2015	Cervantes	21.15 (141)	Dandaragan	5.8 (38)
2016	Cervantes	12.11 (83)	Lancelin-Ledge Point	9.5 (59)
2017	Jurien Bay	11.13 (79)	Lancelin-Ledge Point	5.12 (42)
2018	Cervantes	17.6 (108)	Lancelin-Ledge Point	13.5 (83)
2019	Cervantes	15.8 (98)	Lancelin-Ledge Point	13.10 (88)
2021	Lancelin-Ledge Point	10.7 (67)	Cervantes	5.10 (40)
2022	Cervantes	13.19 (97)	Moora Mavericks	10.12 (72)
2023	Jurien Bay	13.11 (88)	Dandaragan	4.7 (31)
2024	Dandaragan	16.10 (106)	Jurien Bay	6.4 (40)
2025	Dandaragan	7.9 (51)	Cervantes	5.10 (40)
2026	Cervantes	13.10 (88)	Dandaragan	9.15 (69)

== Ladders ==
=== 2011 ladder ===
Central Midlands	Wins	Byes	Losses	Draws	For	Against	%	Pts	Final	Team	G	B	Pts	Team	G	B	Pts
Cervantes	16	0	0	0	2577	933	276.21%	64	1st semi	Dandaragan	25	15	165	Lancelin	8	2	50
Jurien Bay	9	0	7	0	1462	1418	103.10%	36	2nd semi	Cervantes	23	17	155	Jurien Bay	5	4	34
Dandaragan	9	0	7	0	1632	1624	100.49%	36	Preliminary	Jurien Bay	13	14	92	Dadaragan	12	11	83
Lancelin	3	0	13	0	1306	1945	67.15%	12	Grand	Cervantes	15	21	111	Jurien Bay	3	4	22
Moora Rovers	3	0	13	0	971	2028	47.88%	12									

=== 2012 ladder ===
Central Midlands	Wins	Byes	Losses	Draws	For	Against	%	Pts	Final	Team	G	B	Pts	Team	G	B	Pts
Cervantes	11	0	1	0	1758	858	204.90%	44	1st semi	Lancelin	14	4	88	Moora	3	4	22
Jurien Bay	9	0	3	0	1342	841	159.57%	36	2nd semi	Jurien Bay	24	8	152	Cervantes	15	12	102
Lancelin	7	0	5	0	1387	953	145.54%	28	Preliminary	Cervantes	19	11	125	Lancelin	12	10	82
Moora Rovers	2	0	10	0	683	1504	45.41%	8	Grand	Cervantes	20	12	132	Jurien Bay	11	12	78
Dandaragan	1	0	11	0	853	1867	45.69%	4									

=== 2013 ladder ===
Central Midlands	Wins	Byes	Losses	Draws	For	Against	%	Pts	Final	Team	G	B	Pts	Team	G	B	Pts
Cervantes	11	0	1	0	1909	788	242.26%	44	1st semi	Lancelin	19	11	125	Dandaragan	9	12	66
Jurien Bay	8	0	4	0	1440	1053	136.75%	32	2nd semi	Jurien Bay	10	11	71	Cervantes	15	9	99
Lancelin	5	0	7	0	1172	1312	89.33%	20	Preliminary	Lancelin	20	12	132	Jurien Bay	8	11	59
Dandaragan	4	0	8	0	972	1709	56.88%	16	Grand	Cervantes	20	15	135	Jurien Bay	9	6	60
Moora Mavericks	2	0	10	0	986	1617	60.98%	8									

=== 2014 ladder ===
Central Midlands	Wins	Byes	Losses	Draws	For	Against	%	Pts	Final	Team	G	B	Pts	Team	G	B	Pts
Lancelin	10	0	2	0	1536	749	205.07%	40	1st semi	Moora	18	19	127	Dandaragan	8	9	57
Cervantes	10	0	2	0	1648	977	168.68%	40	2nd semi	Lancelin	16	6	102	Cervantes	13	14	92
Moora Mavericks	6	0	6	0	1190	1066	111.63%	24	Preliminary	Cervantes	14	11	95	Moora	8	7	55
Dandaragan	3	0	9	0	894	1587	56.33%	12	Grand	Lancelin	10	13	73	Cervantes	9	15	69
Jurien Bay	1	0	11	0	856	1745	49.05%	4									

=== 2015 ladder ===
Central Midlands	Wins	Byes	Losses	Draws	For	Against	%	Pts	Final	Team	G	B	Pts	Team	G	B	Pts
Lancelin	11	0	1	0	1437	695	206.76%	44	1st semi	Dandaragan	12	17	89	Moora	8	12	60
Cervantes	9	0	3	0	1691	800	211.38%	36	2nd semi	Cervantes	16	10	106	Lancelin	10	11	71
Dandaragan	4	0	8	0	1131	1424	79.42%	16	Preliminary	Dandaragan	7	10	52	Lancelin	7	9	51
Moora Mavericks	3	0	9	0	1018	1440	70.69%	12	Grand	Cervantes	21	15	141	Dandaragan	5	8	38
Jurien Bay	3	0	9	0	923	1731	53.32%	12									

=== 2016 ladder ===
Central Midlands	Wins	Byes	Losses	Draws	For	Against	%	Pts	Final	Team	G	B	Pts	Team	G	B	Pts
Cervantes	11	0	1	0	1718	762	225.46%	44	1st semi	Jurien Bay	16	20	116	Dandaragan	9	13	67
Lancelin	8	0	4	0	978	817	119.71%	32	2nd semi	Cervantes	10	5	65	Lancelin	4	11	35
Dandaragan	6	0	6	0	967	999	96.80%	24	Preliminary	Lancelin	8	5	53	Jurien Bay	6	6	42
Jurien Bay	5	0	7	0	1100	1062	103.58%	20	Grand	Cervantes	18	19	127	Lancelin	9	5	59
Moora Mavericks	0	0	12	0	667	1910	34.92%	0									

=== 2017 ladder ===
Central Midlands	Wins	Byes	Losses	Draws	For	Against	%	Pts	Final	Team	G	B	Pts	Team	G	B	Pts
Jurien Bay	12	0	0	0	1791	548	326.82%	48	1st semi	Lancelin	8	15	63	Moora Rovers	8	6	54
Cervantes	7	0	5	0	1044	1151	90.70%	28	2nd semi	Jurien Bay	23	24	162	Cervantes	3	3	21
Lancelin	4	0	8	0	1040	1174	88.59%	16	Preliminary	Lancelin	13	22	100	Cervantes	5	6	36
Moora Mavericks	4	0	8	0	1051	1495	70.30%	16	Grand	Jurien Bay	11	13	79	Lancelin	5	12	42
Dandaragan	3	0	9	0	833	1391	59.88%	12									
