= Gascoyne Football Association =

Football competition

- Formerly: Carnarvon Football Association
- Sport: Australian rules football
- First season: 1908
- No. of teams: 3
- Most recent champion: Exmouth (2026)
- Most titles: Ramblers (45)

The Gascoyne Football Association is an Australian rules football competition based in Carnarvon and Exmouth in Western Australia. The association was formed in 1908.

== History ==
In 1908 a group of enthusiasts wanted to bring football to the town of Carnarvon. From a list of players two teams were created and a competition begun. The first two teams were called Carnarvon and Ramblers. In 1913 committee infighting caused the Ramblers to implode and were replaced by the Rovers. Several games were played but the season folded.

After The Great War, interest again was sufficient for the competition to start again, this time the teams were Carnarvon and Gascoyne. This arrangement lasted from 1919 until the Great Depression caused difficulties and a restructure occurred in 1932. Two new teams were created, Federals and Rovers and this format lasted for three years before a lack of interest in the competition with four rounds remaining saw the 1934 season abandoned, despite one win separating the two clubs. Instead, matches were arranged against other towns.

Another restructure took place in 1935 with the town split into East Carnarvon and West Carnarvon, but a lack of East Carnarvon players saw the season abandoned without a premier being publicly declared in 1936. The CFA resumed in 1937 and in 1938, a third team Gascoyne was added as there were now sufficient players in Carnarvon. In 1939, there was no organised sport played in the town, with football, cricket and tennis all lapsing into recess in the lead up to World War II.

== Clubs ==
=== Locations ===
Locations of the Gascoyne FL clubs

=== Current ===
Club	Colours	Nickname	Home Ground	Est.	Years	Premierships	
Club	Colours	Nickname	Home Ground	Est.	Years	Total	Years
Exmouth		Eagles	Talanjee Oval, Exmouth	1993	1993-	11	1995, 1996, 1999, 2006, 2007, 2009, 2016, 2020, 2023, 2024, 2025, 2026
Ramblers		Tigers	Festival Grounds, East Carnarvon	1948	1948-	45	1948, 1954, 1956, 1957, 1959, 1960, 1962, 1963, 1967, 1968, 1971, 1973, 1974, 1977, 1978, 1979, 1981, 1983, 1984, 1985, 1987, 1988, 1989, 1990, 1991, 1992, 1993, 1997, 1998, 2000, 2001, 2002, 2004, 2005, 2008, 2010, 2011, 2012, 2013, 2014, 2015, 2017, 2019, 2021, 2022
Warriors		Warriors	Festival Grounds, East Carnarvon	1948	1948-2019, 2022-	10	1958, 1961, 1965, 1975, 1976, 1979, 1980, 1982, 1986, 2018

=== Former ===
Club	Colours	Nickname	Home Ground	Est.	Years	Premierships		Fate
Club	Colours	Nickname	Home Ground	Est.	Years	Total	Years	Fate
Carnarvon		Boomers	Festival Grounds, East Carnarvon	2020	2020-2021	0	-	Merger of Warriors and Gascoyne due to low numbers. De-merged in 2022.
Carnarvon		Magpies	Carnarvon	1908	1908-1913, 1919-1931, 1940-1947	10	1909, 1910, 1923, 1924, 1926, 1927, 1928, 1940, 1941, 1947	Folded
East Carnarvon	(1970s)(?-2005)	Lions	Carnarvon	1935	1935-1938, 1948-2005	14	1937, 1938, 1949, 1950, 1951, 1952, 1953, 1955, 1964, 1966, 1969, 1970, 1972, 2003	Folded after 2005 season
Federals			Carnarvon	1932	1932-1934	2	1932, 1933	Folded
Gascoyne		Hawks	Carnarvon	1919	1919-1958, 1994-2019	9	1919, 1920, 1921, 1922, 1925, 1929, 1930, 1931, 1994	Merged with Warriors to form Boomers after 2019 season, folded after de-merge in 2021
Ramblers (original)			Carnarvon	1908	1908-1912	3	1908, 1911, 1912	Folded due to infighting in 1913
Rovers			Carnarvon	1913	1913, 1932-1934	0	-	Folded
West Carnarvon			Carnarvon	1935	1935-1938	1	1935	Folded

== 2018 Ladder ==
Gascoyne	Wins	Byes	Losses	Draws	For	Against	%	Pts	Final	Team	G	B	Pts	Team	G	B	Pts
Exmouth	9	0	3	0	1222	642	190.34%	36	Preliminary	Warriors	7	15	57	Ramblers	6	10	46
Warriors	9	0	3	0	1105	829	133.29%	36	Grand	Warriors	12	8	80	Exmouth	10	11	71
Ramblers	6	0	6	0	1123	842	133.37%	24									
Gascoyne	0	0	12	0	502	1639	30.63%	0									

== 2019 Ladder ==
Gascoyne	Wins	Byes	Losses	Draws	For	Against	%	Pts	Final	Team	G	B	Pts	Team	G	B	Pts
Ramblers	7	0	1	0	920	191	481.68%	28	Preliminary	Exmouth	18	10	118	Gascoyne	8	5	53
Exmouth	5	0	3	0	399	242	164.88%	20	Grand	Ramblers	9	12	66	Exmouth	10	6	66
Gascoyne	1	0	5	2	374	798	46.87%	8									
Warriors	1	0	6	1	475	937	50.69%	6									

== 2020 Ladder ==
Gascoyne	Wins	Byes	Losses	Draws	For	Against	%	Pts	Final	Team	G	B	Pts	Team	G	B	Pts
Exmouth	4	0	0	0	519	163	318.40%	16									
Ramblers	2	0	2	0	243	337	72.11%	8	Grand	Exmouth	16	13	109	Ramblers	8	3	51
Boomers	0	0	4	0	196	458	42.79%	0									

== 2021 Ladder ==
Gascoyne	Wins	Byes	Losses	Draws	For	Against	%	Pts	Final	Team	G	B	Pts	Team	G	B	Pts
Ramblers	7	0	1	0	787	375	209.87%	28	Grand	Ramblers	15	14	104	Exmouth	9	8	62
Exmouth	5	0	3	0	849	415	204.58%	20									
Boomers	0	0	8	0	261	1107	23.58%	0									

== 2022 Ladder ==
Gascoyne	Wins	Byes	Losses	Draws	For	Against	%	Pts	Final	Team	G	B	Pts	Team	G	B	Pts
Ramblers	7	0	0	0	871	209	416.75%	28	Grand	Ramblers	12	14	86	Exmouth	3	2	20
Exmouth	4	0	4	0	617	558	110.57%	16									
Warriors	1	0	5	0	301	850	35.41%	4									

== 2023 Ladder ==
Gascoyne	Wins	Byes	Losses	Draws	For	Against	%	Pts	Final	Team	G	B	Pts	Team	G	B	Pts
Exmouth	8	0	0	0	1086	251	432.67%	32	Grand	Exmouth	24	17	161	Ramblers	7	7	49
Ramblers	3	0	5	0	564	655	86.11%	12									
Warriors	1	0	7	0	283	1027	27.56%	4									
