= List of Australian rules football leagues in Australia =

This is an incomplete list of men's Australian rules football leagues in Australia.

There is also a Victorian only list of former Associations and Leagues too. In the early 1900s a lot of club's would move from one association to another and other football associations would be formed amongst nearby small rural clubs and towns.

There are active leagues in all states and territories for senior players.

For Women's Australian rules football see List of Australian rules football leagues in Australia

See Also 'List of Australian rules football leagues outside Australia

For Rec Footy (social non-contact) competitions, see Rec Footy#List of AFL Rec Footy Competitions.

== Senior Football Leagues ==
=== Current ===
Name	State	Founded	Clubs	Divisions
Adelaide Footy League	South Australia	1911	68	7
Adelaide Plains Football League	South Australia	1904	7	1
AFL Cairns	Queensland	1957	7	1
AFL Capricornia	Queensland	1974	6	1
AFL Darling Downs	Queensland	1971	7	2
AFL Mackay	Queensland	1970	7	1
AFL Mount Isa	Queensland	1967	4	1
AFL Townsville	Queensland	1955	5	1
AFL Wide Bay	Queensland	1987	4	1
Alberton Football League	Victoria	1946	7	1
Australian Football League	National	1897	18	1
Avon Football Association	Western Australia	1959	7	1
Ballarat Football League	Victoria	1893	11	1
Barkly Australian Football League	Northern Territory	1991	7	1
Barossa Light & Gawler Football Association	South Australia	1987	9	1
Bellarine Football League	Victoria	1971	10	1
Bendigo Football League	Victoria	1880	10	1
Big Rivers Australian Football League	Northern Territory	1982	8	1
Black Diamond Australian Football League	New South Wales	1888	15	3
Broken Hill Football League	New South Wales	1890	4	1
Central Australian Football League	Northern Territory	1947	15	3
Central Highlands Football League	Victoria	1979	18	1
Central Kimberley Football Association	Western Australia	1991	5	1
Central Midlands Coastal Football League	Western Australia	1992	5	1
Central Murray Football League	Victoria	1997	11	1
Central West Australian Football League	New South Wales	1981	4	1
Central Wheatbelt Football League	Western Australia	1967	6	1
Circular Head Football Association	Tasmania	1919	4	1
Colac & District Football League	Victoria	1937	11	1
Darwin Football Association	Tasmania	1951	8	1
East Gippsland Football League	Victoria	1974	8	1
East Kimberley Football Association	Western Australia	1970	10	1
Eastern Districts Football League	Western Australia	1960	8	1
Eastern Eyre Football League	South Australia	1989	4	1
Eastern Football League	Victoria	1997	46	5
Ellinbank & District Football League	Victoria	1937	15	1
Esperance District Football Association	Western Australia	1956	4	1
Essendon District Football League	Victoria	1930	26	3
Far North Football League	South Australia	1948	5	1
Far West Football League	South Australia	1909	4	1
Farrer Football League	New South Wales	1957	9	1
Fortescue National Football League	Western Australia	1971	4	1
Gascoyne Football Association	Western Australia	1908	4	1
Geelong & District Football League	Victoria	1880	12	1
Geelong Football League	Victoria	1979	12	1
Gippsland League	Victoria	2002	10	1
Golden Rivers Football League	Victoria	1998	9	1
Goldfields Football League	Western Australia	1896	5	1
Goulburn Valley Football League	Victoria	1892	12	1
Gove Australian Football League	Northern Territory	1975	5	1
Great Flinders Football League	South Australia	1927	6	1
Great Northern Football League	Western Australia	1961	7	1
Great Southern Football League	South Australia	1923	10	1
Great Southern Football League	Western Australia	1990	6	1
Hampden Football Netball League	Victoria	1930	10	1
Heathcote District Football League	Victoria	1907	9	1
Hills Football League	South Australia	1902	19	2
Horsham & District Football League	Victoria	1937	11	1
Hume Football League	New South Wales	1935	15	1
Kangaroo Island Football League	South Australia	1950	5	1
King Island Football Association	Tasmania	1908	3	1
Kowree-Naracoorte-Tatiara Football League	South Australia	1993	11	1
Kyabram & District Football League	Victoria	1932	13	1
Loddon Valley Football League	Victoria	1902	9	1
Lower South West Football League	Western Australia	1959	7	1
Mallee Football League	South Australia / Victoria	1994	6	1
Maryborough Castlemaine District Football League	Victoria	1982	14	1
Mid Gippsland Football League	Victoria	1936	10	1
Mid South Eastern Football League	South Australia	1936	9	1
Mid West Football League	South Australia	1988	6	1
Millewa Football League	Victoria	1926	6	1
Mininera & District Football League	Victoria	1925	12	1
Mornington Peninsula Nepean Football League	Victoria	1987	22	2
Mortlock Football League	Western Australia	1945	7	1
Murray Football League	Victoria	1931	13	1
Newman National Football League	Western Australia	1972	4	1
North Central Football League	Victoria	1930	7	1
North Coast Australian Football League	New South Wales	1982	5	1
North Eastern Football League	South Australia	1946	8	1
North Gippsland Football League	Victoria	1955	11	1
North Midlands Football League	Western Australia	1924	6	1
North Pilbara Football League	Western Australia	1977	6	1
North West Football League	Tasmania	1987	8	1
North Western Football Association	Tasmania	1894	9	1
Northern Areas Football Association	South Australia	1909	6	1
Northern Football League	Victoria	1922	25	3
Northern Riverina Football League	New South Wales	1924	6	1
Northern Tasmanian Football Association	Tasmania	1996	19	2
Northern Territory Football League	Northern Territory	1916	8	1
Oatlands District Football Association	Tasmania	1952	8	1
Old Scholars Football Association	Tasmania	1987	7	1
Omeo & District Football League	Victoria	1925	6	1
Ongerup Football Association	Western Australia	1963	6	1
Ovens & King Football League	Victoria	1902	12	1
Ovens & Murray Football League	Victoria/ New South Wales	1894	10	1
Peel Football League	South Australia	1992	8	1
Picola & District Football League	Victoria	1935	17	2
Port Lincoln Football League	South Australia	1910	6	1
Queensland Australian Football League	Queensland	1905	10	2
Ravensthorpe & Districts Football Association	Western Australia	1968	3	1
Riddell District Football League	Victoria	1902	13	1
Riverina Football League	New South Wales	1982	9	1
Riverland Football League	South Australia	1909	13	2
River Murray Football League	South Australia	1931	7	1
Sapphire Coast Australian Football League	New South Wales	1984	6	1
South Australian National Football League	South Australia	1877	10	1
South Coast Australian Football League	New South Wales	1969	7	1
South East Football Netball League	Victoria	2015	9	1
South West Football League	Western Australia	1957	10	1
South West District Football League	Victoria	1970	8	1
Southern Football League	South Australia	1896	15	1
Southern Football League	Tasmania	1996	10	1
Southern Football League	Victoria	1992	32	3
Spencer Gulf Football League	South Australia	1961	6	1
Sunraysia Football League	Victoria	1945	8	1
Sydney Australian Football League	New South Wales	1903	23	5
Tallangatta & District Football League	Victoria	1908	12	1
Tamworth Football League	New South Wales	1997	7	1
Tasmanian Football League	Tasmania	2009	10	1
Tiwi Islands Football League	Northern Territory	1944	7	1
Upper Great Southern Football League	Western Australia	1959	8	1
Upper Murray Football League	Victoria	1894	6	1
Victorian Amateur Football Association	Victoria	1892	72	7
Victorian Football League	Victoria	1877	22	1
Warrnambool & District Football League	Victoria	1945	12	1
West Australian Amateur Football League	Western Australia	1922	65	6
West Australian Football League	Western Australia	1885	9	1
West Gippsland Football Netball Competition	Victoria	2017	12	1
West Kimberley Football Association	Western Australia	1948	8	1
Western Border Football League	Victoria/ South Australia	1964	6	1
Western Region Football League	Victoria	1931	25	3
Whyalla Football League	South Australia	1927	6	1
Wimmera Football League	Victoria	1937	8	1
Yarra Valley Mountain District Football League	Victoria	1966	19	2
Yorke Peninsula Football League	South Australia	1888	9	1

=== Former Football Associations / Leagues ===
Victoria

Name	State	Founded	Ended	Reason / Premiers
Ailsa Football Association/Borung & Wimmera Football Association	Victoria	c. 1919	c. 1922	
Alberton Football Association/Alberton Shire Football Association	Victoria	1928	1940	Replaced by the Alberton Football League in 1946.
Alberton Shire Football Association/South Gippsland Football Association	Victoria	c. 1889	1927	Replaced by the Alberton Football Association
Allans Flat & District Football Association	Victoria (Nth Est)	1923		Also called Kiewa Valley FA too. 1923 Premiers: Allan's Flat FC
Allansford District Football Association	Victoria			
Alty Trophy	Victoria (Nth Est)	1898		Teams: Bethanga, Gundowring, Osborne's Flat, Wodonga & Yckandandah. 1898 Premiers: Osborne's Flat
Apollo Bay Football Association	Victoria		1934	
Arapiles Football Association	Victoria	1913	1945:after 1 year revival	1913 Premiers: Natimuk FC 1914 Premiers: Natimuk FC 1915 Premiers: Lowan FC
Ararat Inter - Church Football Association	Victoria	1928	1931	
Ararat and District Football Association	Victoria	1931	2000	Shut down by VCFL because of lack of clubs. Remaining clubs dispersed into Horsham & District Football League and Mininera & District Football League
Avoca District Football Association	Victoria	1909	1921	Clubs in the league later moved to the Mountain Creek Football Association and the Pyrenees District Football Association
Avon Football Association	Victoria			
Avon Valley Football Association	Victoria			
Bacchus Marsh Football League	Victoria	1919	1973	Merged with Ballarat FL District Section to form the Ballarat & Bacchus Marsh FL.
Bairnsdale District Football League	Victoria	1947	1972	Merged with the Gippsland FL to form the East Gippsland Football League
Ballarat & Bacchus Marsh Football League	Victoria	1973	1978	Merged with Clunes FL to form the Central Highlands FL.
Ballarat Football League District Section	Victoria	1959	1973	Merged with Bacchus Marsh FL to form the Ballarat and Bacchus Marsh FL.
Ballarat - Wimmera Football League	Victoria	1934	1937	League split into the Ballarat Football League and Wimmera Football League after initially being separate before 1934.
Bass Valley Football Association	Victoria	1901	1954	Merged with Wonthaggi and DFL to form Bass Valley-Wonthaggi & DFL
Bass Valley-Wonthaggi and District Football League	Victoria	1955	1995	League broken up with teams joining the Alberton FL and Ellinbank DFL.
Benalla District League	Victoria (Nth Est)	1929	1931	Clubs moved across to the Tatong & Thoona District FA
Benalla & District Football League	Victoria (Nth Est)	1947	2009	Shut down by VCFL after 2009 because of a lack of clubs, who moved in the O&KFL
Benalla Mulwala Football League	Victoria (Nth Est)	1930	1937	Teams crossed over to the Benalla Tungamah Football League in 1938.
Benalla Yarrawonga Football Association	Victoria (Nth Est)	1906	1930	Teams moved across to the Benalla Mulwala FA in 1931
Benalla Yarrawonga Lines Football Association	Victoria (Nth Est)	1922		1922 Premiers: Devenish
Benambra Football Association	Victoria (Nth Est)	1899		Teams: Eskdale, Mitta, Sandy Creek, Tallandoon & Tallangatta. Swanton & Shannon Storekeepers Trophy. 1899 Premiers: Mitta
Bourke Evelyn Football League	Victoria	1890	c. 1920	A number of clubs joined the Diamond Valley FL.
J R Bremner Cup	Victoria (Mansfield)	1900		1900 - Mansfield & District Football competition cup Premiers: Mansfield FC
Bright Shire Football Association	Victoria (Nth Est)	1900	1935	Name change to Myrtleford & Bright Football League in 1936
Cahill Cup	Victoria (Nth Est)	1893		
Carkeek Trophy	Victoria (Nth Est)	1898		Teams: Eskdale, Mitta Mitta, Sandy Creek, Tallangatta, 1898 Premiers: Tallangatta FC
Catholic Young Men Society	Victoria	1910	1974	Disbanded, Clubs joined YCW or Metropolitan FL
Central Gippsland Football League	Victoria	1909	1953	Restructure caused the formation of Latrobe Valley FL
Central Goulburn Valley Football League	Victoria	1946	1952	Went into recess at 1953 CGVFL - AGM.
Chiltern & District Football Association	Victoria (Nth Est)	1912	1956	Clubs moved to O&KFL, Hume FL in 1957
Clunes Football League	Victoria	1931	1978	Merged with Ballarat and Bacchus Marsh FL to form the Central Highlands FL.
Craven Football Trophy	Victoria (Nth Est)	1892	1894	Cup donated by Albert William Craven (MLA for Benambra).
Dederang & District Football Association	Victoria (Nth Est)	1935	1939	1935 Premiers: Eskdale FC 1936 Premiers: Tawonga FC 1937 Premiers: Kiewa FC 1938 Premiers: Eskdale FC 1939 Premiers: Tallangatta FC 1940 - Name change to Kiewa & Mitta Football League
Devenish Dookie Football Association	Victoria (Nth Est)	1899	1914	Competition years of 1899, 1909 & 1914.
Dookie Football Association	Victoria (Nth Est)	1910		1910 - Grand Final: St. James Socialables d St. James
Dookie Line Football Association	Victoria (Nth Est)	1919	1919	
Eastern District Football League	Victoria	1962	1997	Merged with Knox Junior Football Association to form the EFL
Eastern Suburban Churches Football League	Victoria	1923	1993	Mergred With the SFL
Echuca Football League	Victoria	1932	1989	
Fagan McKay Trophy	Victoria (Nth Est)	1909		1909 - Premiers: Tallangatta Valley FC
Fifteen Mile Creek Football Association	Victoria (Nth Est)	1910	1910	1910 Premiers: Greta South FC
J H Fitzgerald Cup	Victoria (Nth Est)	1884		Fitzgerald was a solicitor in Yarrawonga who donated a cup.
Freshwater Creek District Football Association	Victoria	1920		
Federal District Football Association	Victoria / NSW	1897	1902	
Tom Gardner Cup	Victoria (Mansfield)	1891		Competition cup between Mansfield & Jamieson
Gippsland Football League	Victoria	1902	1972	Merged with the Bairnsdale District FL to form the East Gippsland Football League
Gippsland Latrobe Football League	Victoria	1954	2001	Merged with the West Gippsland FL to form the WGLFL
Glen Alvie Football Association	Victoria	1932	1945	Merged with the Wonthaggia FA to form the Wonthaggia & DFL
Goorambat / Thoona Football Association	Victoria (Nth Est)	1910		1910 Premiers: Thoona
Goulburn Valley Football Association	Victoria	1888	1930	Reformed in 1937, then a name change to Central Goulburn Valley Football League in 1946.
Goulburn Valley Second Eighteens Football Association	Victoria	1926	1936	Name changed to just Goulburn Valley Football Association at 1937 AGM.
Greta / Glenrowan Football Association	Victoria (Nth Est)	1906	1906	Restructured competition. Moved into another local association.
Greta / Thoona Football Association	Victoria (Nth Est)	1919	1926	
Heidelberg District Football League	Victoria	1909	1921	Renamed the Diamond Valley FL for season 1922
Heytesbury Football League	Victoria	1980	1991	Merged with Mt Noorat Football League to form the Heytesbury Mt Noorat Football League.
Heytesbury Mt Noorat Football League	Victoria	1992	2002	Competition no longer viable.
Johnson Trophy	Victoria (Nth Est)	1896		
Katandra & District Football Association	Victoria (Goulburn Valley)	1930		
Kiewa & Mitta Football League	Victoria (Nth Est)	1940	1940	1940 Premiers: Mitta Valley. K&MFL folded after 1940 season due to WW2
Kiewa Valley Football Association	Victoria (Nth Est)	1902	1904	Played for the Haig Trophy. 1902 Premiers: Gundowring FC 1904 Premiers: Yackandandah FC KVFA reformed in 1920. 1920 Premiers: Tallangatta 1921 Premiers: Granya FC 1924 Premiers: Dederang FC 1925 Premiers: Tallangatta 1926 Premiers: Granya FC 1927 Premiers: Granya FC
King Valley Football Association	Victoria (Nth Est)	1920	1934	Teams merged in 1935 to become the King Valley FC & entered the O&KFL
Lexton Football League	Victoria	1945	1998	Merged with the Western Plains Football League to form the Lexton Plains Football League
Lexton Plains Football League	Victoria	1999	2010	Disbanded in December 2010, clubs joined Mininera & District Football League, Maryborough Castlemaine District Football League and Central Highlands Football League
Mitta Mitta Football Association	Victoria (Nth Est)	1905	1907	Two section, 6 teams. 1905 Premiers: Sandy Creek FC. 1906 Premiers: Tallangatta FC 1907 Premiers: Granya FC
Mitta Mitta Football Association	Victoria (Nth Est)	1913		1913 Jerry Blanchfield / Eskdale Hotel Trophy Premiers: Tallangatta Valley FC
Mitta Valley Football Association	1914	1915		1914 & 1915 Jerry Blanchfield/Eskdale Hotel Trophy Premiers: Eskdale FC. MVFA reformed in 1919. 1919 Premiers: Granya FC (unbeaten) 1925 Premiers: Eskdale FC 1928 Premiers: Mitta Valley FC
Moira Football Association	Victoria (Nth Est)	1902	1905	Moira FA & Tungamah FA merge to form Benalla / Yarrawonga FA
Mountain District Football Association	Victoria	c. 1930s	1966	Merged with Yarra Valley FA to form the Yarra Valley Mountain DFL
Mount Noorat Football League	Victoria	1930	1991	Merged with Heytesbury Football League to form the Heytesbury Mt Noorat Football League.
Mount Pleasant Football Association	Victoria (Nth Est)	1911	1912	1911 Premiers: Tatong FC. 1912 Premiers: Greta South FC
Murphy's Football Association	Victoria (Nth Est)	1906		Played for the Murphy's Albion Hotel Trophy. 1906 Premiers: Yackandandah FC
Murray Valley & North East Patriotic Football League	Victoria (Nth Est)	1944	1949	
Myrtleford & Bright District Football League	Victoria (Nth Est)	1936	1949	Walsh Shield
Nobel Hamburg Explosives Football Trophy	Victoria (Nth Est)	1900	1901	Teams: Eskdale, Granya, Mitta Mitta, Sandy Creek & Tallangatta. 1900 Premiers: Mitta. 1901 Premiers: Granya
North East Central Football Association	Victoria (Nth Est)	1904		3 teams: Albury Imperials, Beechworth & Chiltern who moved into other competitions in 1905.
North East District Football Association	Victoria (Nth Est)	1891	1912	Clubs: Avenel, Benalla, Broadford, Euroa, Kilmore, Longwood, Nagambie, Seymour, Tallarook, Violet Town, Wandong, Yea. Superseded by the Waranga & North East FA.
North East Lines Football Association	Victoria (Nth Est)	1920	1921	1920 & 21 - Premiers: Benalla Rovers.
Northern & Echuca Football League	Victoria	1990	1996	1997- Merged with Mid Murray Football League to form the Central Murray Football Netball League
Ovens District Football Association	Victoria (Nth Est)	1895	1899	John A Isaacs Trophy. Superseded by Bright Shire FA.
Ovens Valley Football Association	Victoria (Nth Est)	1913	1914	1913 Premiers: Gapsted FC 1914 Premiers: Myrtleford FC. Went into recess in 1915 due to WW1.
Panton Hill and District Football League	Victoria	1931	1987	Clubs opted to leave and join the Diamond Valley FL and the Riddell District FL.
Portland District Football League	Victoria	1955	1969	Merged with Port Fairy Football League to form Portland Port Fairy Football League.
Port Fairy Football League	Victoria	1926	1969	Merged with Portland District Football League to form Portland Port Fairy Football League.
Riviera Football League	Victoria	1986	2003	Lack of clubs resulted in a merger with the East Gippsland FL.
Rout Trophy	Victoria (Nth Est)	1904		Teams: Eskdale, Granya, Mitta Mitta & Tallangatta. 1904 Premiers: Granya FC
Simons Loveridge Trophy	Victoria (Nth Est)	1900		1900 Premiers: Federals FC
South Gippsland Football League	Victoria	1954	1969	Competition not viable after weaker clubs left.
South West Gippsland Football League	Victoria	1954	1994	League was absorbed by the Mornington Peninsula Nepean Football League
Tallangatta Football Association	Victoria (Nth Est)	1908		1908 - McKay Fagan Trophy Premiers: Sandy Creek FC. Reformed in 1922. Premiers: Tallangatta FC 1923 Premiers: Kiewa FC 1929 Premiers: Granya FC 1930 Premiers: Mitta Mitta FC 1931 Premiers: Mitta FC in 1935 clubs moved to the Dederang FA.
Tatong Thoona Football League	Victoria (Nth Est)	1932	1940	Went into recess due to WW2 & was superseded by the Benalla & District Football League in 1946
Thoona District Football Association	Victoria (Nth Est)	1911	1911	
Thoona / Glenrowan Football Association	Victoria (Nth Est)	1907	1929	
Twamley Football Trophy	Victoria (Nth Est)	1910		1910 - Premiers: Granya FC 1911 Premiers: Tallangatta Valley FC
Twomey Stewart Trophy	Victoria (Nth Est)	1909		1909 Premiers: Wodonga FC
Tungamah Football League	Victoria (Nth Est)	1945	1996	Merged with Goulburn Valley FL and became 2nd division and then the Central Gippsland FL. Most TFL clubs are now part of the Picola DFL.
Waranga & Nth Est Football Association	Victoria (Nth Est)	1913	1976	John Gordon (MLA) Sheild (1913–26). Mick Minogue Shield (1927–38).
Weiss Trophy	Victoria (Nth Est)	1897		Donor – Karl Weis' Saloon, Wodonga. 1897 Premiers: Gundowring FC
West Gippsland Football league	Victoria	1927	2001	Merged with the Gippsland Latrobe FL to form the WGLFL
Western Plains Football League	Victoria	1930	1998	Merged with the Lexton Football League to form the Lexton Plains Football League
Western Port - Wonthaggi Football Association	Victoria		1936	Merged with the Wonthaggi JFA to form the Wonthaggi FA
Wilby & District Football Association	Victoria (Nth Est)	1914	1941	1914 & 15 then 1940 & 41.
Winton / Glenrowan Football Association	Victoria (Nth Est)	1907	1908	
Winton / Greta Football Association	Victoria (Nth Est)	1914	1914	
Wodonga & District Football Association	Victoria (Nth Est)	1914		1914 Premiers: Federal Railways FC
Wonthaggi and District Football League	Victoria	1945	1954	Merged with the Bass Valley FL to form Bass Valley-Wonthaggi & DFL
Wonthaggi Football Association	Victoria	1937	1944	Merged with the Glen Alive FA to form Wonthaggi & DFL
Wonthaggi Junior Football Association	Victoria	1923	1936	Merged with the Western Port - Wonthaggi FA to form the Wonthaggi FA
Wycheproof-Charlton District Football Association	Victoria	1890		
Yackandandah & District Football Association	Victoria (Nth Est)	1912		1912 Premiers: Dederang FC 1928 Premiers: (Malcomson Trophy) Yackandandah FC 1929 Premiers: Bethanga FC 1930 Premiers: Kergunyah FC
Yackandandah & District Football League	Victoria (Nth Est)	1931 & 40	1954	Y&DFA changed its name to Y&DF League in 1931. 1931 Premiers: Talgarno FC 1940 Premiers: Yackandandah FC
Yarra Valley Football Association	Victoria	1920	1966	Merged with Mountain DFL to form the Yarra Valley Mountain DFL
Yarrawonga & Border Football Association	Victoria (Nth Est)	1895	1919	In 1920 Yarrawonga returned to play in the Benalla Yarrawonga FA
Yungera District Football Association	Victoria	1930		
Youth Christian Workers Football League	Victoria	1958	1986	Many clubs joined the Eastern Suburban Churches FA.

=== Australia wide ===
Name	State	Founded	Ended	Reason / Premiers
Adelaide Football Association	South Australia	c. 1916	c. 1920	
Adelaide Metropolitan Football League/Metropolitan Football Association	South Australia			
Adelaide Suburban Football League/Norwood-North Adelaide Football Association	South Australia	1969	c. 1979	
Adelaide & Suburban Football League/South Adelaide District Football Association	South Australia	1911	1947	Many clubs had moved to the West Torrens District Football Association.
AFL Canberra	ACT & NSW	1924	2010	Merged with QAFL to form North East Australian Football League
Albany Football Association	Western Australia		1957	Merged with the Mount Barker FA to form the Southern Districts Football League.
Albert Football Association	South Australia	1920	1923	Disbanded due to many clubs folding.
Albury & Border Football Association	New South Wales	c. 1919	1927	1919 & 20 Premiers: St. Patrick's FC 1921 Premiers: Diggers FC 1922 & 23 Premiers: Hume Weir FC 1924 Premiers: Lavington FC 1925 Premiers: Ebden Rovers FC 1926 & 27 Premiers: Albury Rovers FC
Albury & District Football League	New South Wales	c. 1930	1957	Clubs moved to the Farrer Football League in 1956 & 57.
Albury-Bandiana Australian Rules Army Competition	New South Wales/Victoria	1944	1945	Merged with the Bonegilla Australian Rules Army Competition to form the Bandiana-Bonegilla Australian Rules Army Competition
Alice Springs Football Association	Northern Territory			
Ardlethan District Football League	New South Wales			
Ariah Park & District Football League	New South Wales		c. 1952	
Arthur West Football League	Western Australia			
Augusta-Margaret River Football Association	Western Australia			
Berrigan Football Association	New South Wales (Riverina)			
Bundaberg Australian Football League	Queensland	1972	1986	Merged with Wide Bay Australian Football League
Central Highlands Australian Football League	Queensland	1983	1997	Folded due to lack of player numbers
Central Hume Football Association	New South Wales (Riverina)	1928	1934	Clubs moved into the Hume Football League
Central Riverina National Football League	New South Wales (Riverina)	1949	1981	Premiers: 1949 – Lockhart FC, 1950 – Osborne FC, 1951 – Collingullie, 1952 – Collingullie, 1953 – Boree Creek FC, 1954 – Yerong Creek FC d Milbrulong
Clear Hills Football Association	New South Wales (Riverina)	1902	1903	
Coreen & District Football League	New South Wales	1909	2007	Club mergers made the league unviable and remaining clubs joined the Hume FL.
Corowa & District Football Association	New South Wales (Riverina)	1906	1907	1906 Premiers: Corowa FC, 1907 Premiers: Wahgunyah FC
Corowa & District Football Association	New South Wales (Riverina)	1930	1935	Renamed the Coreen & District Football League in 1936.
Deloraine Football Association	Tasmania	1950	1983	Merged with Esk Football Association to form the Esk-Deloraine Football Association.
Deniliquin Football Association	New South Wales (Riverina)	1900	1932	In 1933, Deniliquin FC was formed & entered the Echuca Football League.
Esk Football Association	Tasmania	1930	1983	Merged with Deloraine Football Association to form the Esk-Deloraine Football Association.
Esk-Deloraine Football Association	Tasmania	1984	1997	All clubs joined the Northern Tasmanian Football Association
Faithful & District Football Association	New South Wales (Riverina)	1920	1940	Went into recess in 1941 due to WW2 & never reformed.
Federal Football Association	New South Wales (Riverina)	1905	1908	
Gold Coast Australian Football League	Queensland	1961	1996	Restructured competition involving Brisbane and Sunshine Coast Clubs
Greengunyah Football Association	New South Wales (Riverina)	1906?		
Huon Football Association	Tasmania	1895	1997	Competition no longer viable. Club moved to Southern FL.
Lockhart & District Football Association	New South Wales (Riverina)	1907		
Leeton & District Football Association	New South Wales (Riverina)	1929	1939	Went into recess in early 1940
Maryborough Australian Football League	Queensland	1981	1983	Folded due to lack of player numbers
Mid Murray Football Association	South Australia	1910	2009	Lack of clubs forced teams to move to the Hills FA and the North East FL.
Milbrulong & District Football League	New South Wales (Riverina)	1945	1948	Premiers: 1945 – The Rock FC, 1946 – Milbrulong FC, 1947 – The Rock FC, 1948 – Lockhart FC. Changed its name to Central Riverina National Football League in 1949
Murray Border Football Association	New South Wales (Riverina)	1895		
North West Football Union	Tasmania	1910	1986	Those clubs that didn't join the new Tasmanian Football League merged with the Northern Tasmania Football Association to create the Northern Tasmania Football League.
Northern Tasmanian Football Association	Tasmania	1886	1986	Those clubs that didn't join the new Tasmanian Football League merged with the North West Football Union to create the Northern Tasmania Football League.
Osborne & District Football Association	New South Wales (Riverina)	1927		
Peninsula Football Association	Tasmania	1988	2001	competition folded after Premaydena went into recess.
Queenstown Football Association	Tasmania	1924	1963	Formed the West Tasmanian FA with Rosebery FA clubs.
Riverina Football Association	New South Wales (Riverina)	1901	1901	1901 Premiers: Burryjaa FC
South Western District Football League	New South Wales (Wagga)	1920	1940	Went into recess in 1941 > WW2. Reformed in 1945
Southern Riverina Football Association	New South Wales (Riverina)	1905	1931	Teams moved into the Murray Football League in 1932
Students Football Association	South Australia	c. 1922	c. 1937	
Sunday Football League	Western Australia	1983	2009	
Sunshine Coast Australian Football League	Queensland	1970	1992	Restructured competition involving Brisbane and Gold Coast Clubs
Tamar Football Association	Tasmania	1970	1984	clubs joined the Tasmanian Amateurs Northern Division.
Tasman Football Association	Tasmania	1910	2001	clubs joined the Southern Football League.
The Rock Football Association	New South Wales			
Wagga Football Association	New South Wales			
West Tasmanian Football League	Tasmania	1964	1993	Shortage of clubs. Clubs now part of the Darwin FA.
Wide Bay Australian Football League	Queensland	1985	1986	Merged with the Bundaberg Australian Football League

== See also ==
- List of women's Australian rules football leagues
- Countries playing Australian rules football
