= Bob Vagg =

Bob Vagg may refer to:

- Bob Vagg (footballer) (born 1942), former Australian rules footballer
- Bob Vagg (athlete) (born 1940), Australian former long-distance runner
