= Vagg =

Vagg is a surname. Notable people with the surname include:

- Barrie Vagg (born 1943), Australian rules footballer
- Bob Vagg (born 1940), Australian long-distance runner
- Bob Vagg (born 1941), Australian rules footballer
- Stephen Vagg, Australian writer
