= Echuca Football League =

Australian rules football league

- Most recent season or competition: 1989
- Sport: Australian rules football
- Founded: 1932
- First season: 1932
- Folded: 1989
- No. of teams: 7 (1995), 16 (historical)
- Country: Australia
- Last champion: Bunnaloo (1989)
- Most titles: Echuca East (11)
- Related competitions: Northern & Echuca FL; Northern District FL

The Echuca Football League was an Australian rules football league based around the regional towns of Echuca and Moama on the New South Wales-Victoria border. The competition ran, with some short recesses, from 1932 to 1989.

== History ==
The Echuca Football league was founded on the 21st of March 1932, with the inaugural 6 clubs being Echuca East, Echuca Imperials, Elmore, Mathoura, Moama and Rochester Rovers. The first premiership was won by Echuca East over Mathoura. The Deniliquin Football Club was formed to join the Echuca FL in 1933, and won 3 premierships in its first 3 years of competition, a feat equalled by Mathoura in the 3 following seasons.

Due to the large amount of travel required between the towns involved in the league, some clubs began to struggle financially during the mid-1930s. Moama were forced into recess for three seasons in 1934 due to financial issues, and were joined by Elmore and Rochester Rovers a year later. This left the league with only 4 clubs for the 1936 season. Deniliquin did not affiliate with the EFL for the 1937 season, citing the lack of a semi-final at their home ground as their reason for doing so. They would return a year later. Cummeragunja joined for the 1939 season, however their stay was short-lived as the EFL entered recess due to World War II a year later.

The EFL re-formed in 1946, with Cummeragunja and Imperials replaced by Bamawm Extension and Echuca. Elmore re-joined a year later, giving the league 7 clubs. Attempts were made to find an eighth team to remove the bye, however these were unsuccessful. Echuca won three straight premierships between 1946 and 1948.

The EFL was forced into recess before the 1949 season after the three strongest clubs - Echuca, Deniliquin and Echuca East departed. The remaining clubs dispersed amongst a number of local leagues.

1952 saw the EFL revived again, with Bamawm and Bunnaloo joining Moama, Mathoura and Bamawm Extension. Rochester East were originally included in the re-formed league but dropped out on the 17th of April. The newly-formed Echuca South club entered in their place a week later. Echuca East re-joined from the Goulburn Valley FL after the 1952 season. Lockington-Tennyson also joined for the 1953 season as Union, however their former league, the Mitiamo & District FL, blocked the transfers of their players, forcing them to forfeit their first two games.

The 8 clubs of the EFL remained constant between 1953 and 1988, aside from Union folding to allow Lockington to re-form in 1959. Bamawm Extension entered recess due to a lack of players after the 1988 season, and with only 7 teams remaining the Echuca FL merged with the Northern District Football League to form the Northern & Echuca FL before the 1990 season. Echuca East, Echuca South, Moama and Lockington Bamawm United (a merger of Lockington and the two Bamawm clubs) joined the new league, while Mathoura moved to the Picola & District Football League and Bunnaloo folded due to a lack of players.

== Clubs ==
=== Final ===
Club	Colours	Nickname	Home Ground	Former League	Est.	Years in EFL	EFL Senior Premierships		Fate
Club	Colours	Nickname	Home Ground	Former League	Est.	Years in EFL	Total	Years	Fate
Bamawm		Lions	Bamawm Recreation Reserve, Bamawm	MDFL	1900s	1952-1989	1	1969	Merged with Lockington and Bamawm Extension to form Lockington-Bamawm United in Northern & Echuca FL after 1989 season
Bunnaloo		The Loo	Bunnaloo Recreation Reserve, Bunnaloo	W&DFA	1927	1952-1989	2	1988, 1989	Folded after 1989 season
Echuca East		Green and Whites, Grasshoppers	Echuca Recreation Reserve, Echuca	NGVFL, BFL, GVFL	1892	1932-1939, 1946–1948, 1953–1989	11	1932, 1939, 1953, 1956, 1957, 1958, 1959, 1960, 1962, 1963, 1964	Played in Bendigo FL in 1946 and Goulburn Valley FL between 1949 and 1952. Formed Northern & Echuca FL after 1989 season
Echuca South	(1952-?)(?-1989)	Swans	Echuca South Recreation Reserve, Echuca	–	1952	1952-1989	4	1967, 1974, 1975, 1982	Formed Northern & Echuca FL after 1989 season
Lockington		Cats	Lockington Recreation Reserve, Lockington	MDFL	1920s	1959-1989	9	1970, 1971, 1977, 1978, 1979, 1980, 1983, 1985, 1987	Merged with Bamawm and Bamawm Extension to form Lockington-Bamawm United in Northern & Echuca FL after 1989 season
Mathoura		Timbercutters	Mathoura Recreation Reserve, Mathoura	DFA, ERFA	1909	1932-1939, 1946–1948, 1952–1989	9	1936, 1937, 1938, 1952, 1961, 1973, 1976, 1984, 1986	Played in Edward River FA between 1949 and 1951. Moved to Picola & District FL after 1989 season
Moama		Black and Whites, Mapgies	Moama Recreation Reserve, Moama	NGVFL, ESSFA	1892	1932-1934, 1937–1939, 1946–1948, 1952–1989	5	1965, 1966, 1968, 1972, 1981	In recess between 1935-36. Played in Echuca Sunday Social FA between 1949-51. Formed Northern & Echuca FL after 1989 season

=== Former ===
Club	Colours	Nickname	Home Ground	Former League	Est.	Years in EFL	EFL Senior Premierships		Fate
Club	Colours	Nickname	Home Ground	Former League	Est.	Years in EFL	Total	Years	Fate
Bamawm Extension		Tigers	Bamawm Extension Recreation Reserve, Bamawm Extension	LFA, MDFL	1926	1946-1948, 1952–1988	0	-	Played in Mitiamo & District FL between 1949-51. Recess in 1989. Merged with Bamawm and Lockington to form Lockington-Bamawm United in Northern & Echuca FL after 1989 season
Cummeragunja			None; played "home" games at their opponent's ground	W&MRDFA	1880s	1939	0	-	Folded after 1939 season
Deniliquin		Rams	Hardinge Street Oval, Deniliquin	–	1933	1933-1936, 1938–1939, 1946–1948	3	1933, 1934, 1935	Did not affiliate with a league in 1937. Moved to Murray FL after 1948 season
Echuca		Red and Whites, Bombers	Echuca Recreation Reserve, Echuca	BFL	1874	1946-1948	3	1946, 1947, 1948	Returned to Bendigo FL after 1948 season
Echuca Imperials		Imps	Echuca Recreation Reserve, Echuca	NGVFL		1932-1939	0	-	Folded after 1939 season
Elmore			Elmore Recreation Reserve, Elmore	GVCJFA	1882	1932-1935, 1947–1948	0	-	Entered recess after 1935 season. Moved to Heathcote District FL after 1948 season
Rochester Rovers			Rochester Recreation Reserve, Rochester			1932-1935	0	-	Folded after 1935 season
Tongala		Blues	Tongala Recreation Reserve, Tongala	GVFL	1894	1933-1935	0	-	Moved to Kyabram District FL after 1935 season
Union		Cats	Lockington Recreation Reserve, Lockington	–	1953	1954-1958	2	1954, 1955	Folded to allow Lockington to re-form after 1958 season

== Premierships ==
Year	Premiers	Score	Runners-up	Location	Notes	Ref.
1932	Echuca East	10.14 (74) - 8.14 (62)	Mathoura	Friendly Societies' Ground, Echuca		
1933	Deniliquin	12.8 (80) - 6.17 (53)	Rochester Rovers	Park Oval, Echuca		
1934	Deniliquin	14.10 (94) - 10.14 (14)	Echuca East	Park Oval, Echuca		
1935	Deniliquin	13.10 (88) - 8.11 (59)	Echuca East	Park Oval, Echuca		
1936	Mathoura	12.17 (87) - 8.11 (59)	Deniliquin	Park Oval, Echuca		
1937	Mathoura	19.11 (125) - 11.9 (75)	Echuca East	Park Oval, Echuca		
1938	Mathoura	10.13 (73) - 10.13 (73)	Echuca East	Echuca Oval	Drawn grand final	
1938	Mathoura	14.13 (97) - 7.17 (59)	Echuca East	Echuca Oval	Replay	
1939	Echuca East	11.12 (78) - 11.9 (75)	Mathoura	Park Oval, Echuca		
1940-45 - EFL in recess due to WWII
1946	Echuca	9.13 (67) - 6.5 (41)	Echuca East	Park Oval, Echuca		
1947	Echuca	7.15 (57) - 5.11 (41)	Deniliquin	Park Oval, Echuca		
1948	Echuca	8.8 (56) - 7.4 (46)	Echuca East	Park Oval, Echuca		
1949-51 - EFL in recess
1952	Mathoura	14.17 (95) - 6.9 (45)	Bunnaloo			
1953	Echuca East	11.9 (75) - 5.3 (33)	Bamawm Extension	Park Oval, Echuca		
1954	Union		Bamawm Extension			
1955	Union					
1956	Echuca East					
1957	Echuca East					
1958	Echuca East					
1959	Echuca East					
1960	Echuca East					
1961	Mathoura					
1962	Echuca East					
1963	Echuca East					
1964	Echuca East					
1965	Moama					
1966	Moama					
1967	Echuca South					
1968	Moama					
1969	Bamawm					
1970	Lockington					
1971	Lockington					
1972	Moama					
1973	Mathoura					
1974	Echuca South					
1975	Echuca South					
1976	Mathoura					
1977	Lockington	Margin 5 points	Mathoura			
1978	Lockington					
1979	Lockington					
1980	Lockington					
1981	Moama					
1982	Echuca South					
1983	Lockington					
1984	Mathoura					
1985	Lockington					
1986	Mathoura					
1987	Lockington					
1988	Bunnaloo					
1989	Bunnaloo	Margin - 116 points	Echuca South			
