= Northern District Football League =

Australian rules football league

- Most recent season or competition: 1989
- Sport: Australian rules football
- Founded: 1922
- First season: 1922
- Folded: 1989
- No. of teams: 8 (1989), 16 (historical)
- Country: Australia
- Last champion: Leitchville (1989)
- Most titles: Union (13)
- Related competitions: Northern & Echuca FL; Echuca FL

The Northern District Football League was an Australian rules football league based around the towns of Cohuna and Kerang in northern Victoria.

== History ==
The Northern District Football League began as the Cohuna & District Football Association in 1922 with Cohuna, Union, Wee Wee Rup and Cohuna Fire Brigade as the original clubs. The C&DFA functioned as a junior association for the next few years after Cohuna left for the Elmore-Cohuna Line FA in 1924. The competition was known as the Murray Valley Football League between 1927 and 1930. The league was renamed the Cohuna & District Football Association in 1931 when Cohuna and Leitchville returned from the Kerang & District FA. Koondrook joined for the first time in 1933. The C&DFA went into recess in 1941 due to WWII.

The league was re-formed in 1943 as the Cohuna-Barham Football Association, and by 1945 had returned to its previous name. In 1954, a year after the admission of Pyramid Hill, the league changed its name to the Northern Districts Football League. The line-up of 8 clubs present in 1954 would remain the same until the NDFL's demise at the end of 1989, when it merged with the Echuca Football League to form the Northern & Echuca Football League.

== Clubs ==
=== Final ===
Club	Colours	Nickname	Home Ground	Former League	Est.	Years in NDFL	NDFL Senior Premierships		Fate
Club	Colours	Nickname	Home Ground	Former League	Est.	Years in NDFL	Total	Years	Fate
Border		Magpies	Barham Recreation Reserve, Barham	KDFA	1900s	1931-1989	5	1935, 1937, 1947, 1948, 1973	Formed Northern & Echuca FL after 1989 season
Cohuna	(1930s)(?-1989)	Bloods	Cohuna Recreation Reserve, Cohuna	CGFA, KDFA	1913	1922, 1931–1940, 1944–1989	12	1949, 1952, 1956, 1958, 1959, 1964, 1966, 1967, 1970, 1971, 1977, 1986	Moved to Elmore-Cohuna FL in 1924. Formed Northern & Echuca FL after 1989 season
Gunbower		Demons	Gunbower Recreation Reserve, Gunbower	ECFL	1900s	1927-1989	8	1934, 1943, 1944, 1945, 1946, 1950, 1965, 1980	Formed Northern & Echuca FL after 1989 season
Kerang		Blues	Riverside Park, Kerang	KDFL	1927	1947-1989	7	1951, 1955, 1981, 1983, 1984, 1985, 1987	Formed Northern & Echuca FL after 1989 season
Koondrook	Light-dark-light tri-panel with KFC monogram (1936)(1947-?)(?-1989)	Tigers	Koondrook Recreation Reserve, Koondrook	CGFA, KDFL	1919	1933-1940, 1947–1989	6	1936, 1953, 1957, 1968, 1972, 1979,	Played in Kerang & District FL in 1945–46. Formed Northern & Echuca FL after 1989 season
Leitchville	(1930s)(?-1989)	Maroons	Leitchville Recreaction Reserve, Leitchville	ECFL	1919	1927-1989	11	1929, 1931, 1932, 1933, 1938, 1939, 1949, 1964, 1979, 1980, 1989	Formed Northern & Echuca FL after 1989 season
Pyramid Hill		Panthers	Mitchell Park, Pyramid Hill	MDFL	1890	1953-1989	0	-	Formed Northern & Echuca FL after 1989 season
Union		Kangaroos	Cohuna Recreation Reserve, Cohuna	CGFA	1919	1922-1989	13	1922, 1923, 1927, 1928, 1930, 1960, 1961, 1962, 1963, 1976, 1978, 1982, 1988	Formed Northern & Echuca FL after 1989 season

=== Former ===
Club	Colours	Nickname	Home Ground	Former League	Est.	Years in NDFL	NDFL Senior Premierships		Fate
Club	Colours	Nickname	Home Ground	Former League	Est.	Years in NDFL	Total	Years	Fate
Bolsheviks				–	1932	1932	0	-	Folded
Cohuna Fire Brigade						1922-1928, 1937	0	-	Recess between 1929 and 1936, folded after 1937 season
Horfield						1924-1925	0	-	Moved to Murray Valley FL in 1926
Kerang East						1925-1930	1	1926	Folded after 1930 season
Kerang Fire Brigade				KDFA		1937-1939	0	-	Folded after 1939 season
Moulamein			Moulamein Recreation Reserve, Moulamein	–	1948	1948-1951	0	-	Unaffiliated in 1952-53. Joined Edward River FA in 1954
Quambatook		Tigers	Quambatook Recreation Reserve, Quambatook	KDFL	1910s	1947	0	-	Moved to Korong FL in 1948
Wee Wee Rup				CGFA		1922-1931, 1943	2	1924, 1925	Folded after 1931 season, re-formed in 1943 for one season, then folded

== Premierships ==
Year	Premiers	Score	Runners-up	Location	Notes	Ref.
1922	Union	5.11 (41) - 3.5 (23)	Wee Wee Rup			
1923	Union	4.11 (35) - 5.3 (33)	Cohuna Fire Brigade			
1924	Wee Wee Rup	7.9 (51) - 6.6 (42)	Union			
1925	Wee Wee Rup	5.7 (37) - 4.5 (29)	Union			
1926	Kerang East	6.8 (44) - 6.7 (43)	Union			
1927	Union	9.6 (60) - 5.13 (43)	Kerang East			
1928	Union	10.11 (71) - 7.8 (50)	Leitchville			
1929	Leitchville	7.16 (58) - 3.5 (23)	Gunbower			
1930	Union	13.7 (85) - 8.9 (57)	Border			
1931	Leitchville	14.12 (96) - 7.9 (51)	Union			
1932	Leitchville	10.4 (64) - 4.12 (36)	Border			
1933	Leitchville	11.12 (78) - 5.4 (34)	Border			
1934	Gunbower	7.9 (51) - 4.10 (34)	Border			
1935	Border	14.13 (97) - 9.12 (66)	Gunbower			
1936	Koondrook	12.5 (77) - 9.18 (72)	Border			
1937	Border	16.13 (109) - 15.8 (98)	Koondrook			
1938	Leitchville	14.7 (91) - 13.10 (88)	Cohuna			
1939	Leitchville	8.9 (57) - 6.8 (44)	Koondrook			
1940	?					
1941-42 - C&DFL in recess due to WWII
1943	Gunbower		Barham			
1944	Gunbower	7.9 (51) - Border 4.10 (34)	Border			
1945	Gunbower	14.8 (92) - 11.9 (75)	Leitchville			
1946	Gunbower	10.8 (68) - 7.10 (52)	Leitchville			
1947	Border	5.9 (39) - 3.9 (27)	Koondrook			
1948	Border	11.17 (83) - 10.10 (70)	Gunbower			
1949	Cohuna	11.22 (88) - 7.5 (47)	Gunbower			
1950	Gunbower	11.13 (79) - 10.13 (73)	Koondrook			
1951	Kerang	12.8 (80) - 6.25 (61)	Cohuna			
1952	Cohuna	17.19 (121) - 8.5 (53)	Koondrook			
1953	Koondrook	9.9 (63) - 7.6 (48)	Cohuna			
1954	Leitchville	11.13 (79) - 5.9 (39)	Koondrook			
1955	Kerang	8.18 (66) - 8.11 (59)	Cohuna			
1956	Cohuna	9.6 (60) - 3.8 (24)	Kerang			
1957	Koondrook	10.10 (70) - 9.11 (65)	Kerang			
1958	Cohuna	14.11 (95) - 8.18 (66)	Union			
1959	Cohuna	13.4 (82) - 12.7 (79)	Union			
1960	Union	16.13 (109) - 10.8 (68)	Kerang			
1961	Union	11.14 (80) - 9.5 (59)	Kerang			
1962	Union	7.15 (57) - 4.6 (30)	Gunbower			
1963	Union	13.16 (94) - 11.8 (74)	Gunbower			
1964	Cohuna	10.9 (69) - 9.11 (65)	Union			
1965	Gunbower	15.11 (101) - 14.7 (91)	Cohuna			
1966	Cohuna	4.13 (37) - 5.6 (36)	Koondrook			
1967	Cohuna	12.10 (82) - 6.7 (43)	Leitchville			
1968	Koondrook	9.9 (63) - 5.9 (39)	Cohuna			
1969	Leitchville	13.11 (89) - 7.11 (53)	Cohuna			
1970	Cohuna	18.8 (116) - 9.13 (67)	Leitchville			
1971	Cohuna	15.13 (103) - 12.13 (85)	Koondrook			
1972	Koondrook	15.10 (100) - 13.8 (86)	Border			
1973	Border	14.13 (93) - 13.13 (91)	Koondrook			
1974	Leitchville	11.9 (75) - 10.9 (69)	Koondrook			
1975	Leitchville	24.18 (162) - 10.10 (70)	Koondrook			
1976	Union	9.14 (68) - 9.14 (68)	Cohuna		Drawn grand final	
1976	Union	16.9 (105) - 14.12 (96)	Cohuna		Replay	
1977	Cohuna	10.10 (70) - 6.8 (44)	Border			
1978	Union	18.16 (118) - 16.17 (113)	Cohuna			
1979	Koondrook	8.5 (53) - 4.8 (32)	Cohuna			
1980	Gunbower	19.19 (133) - 7.7 (49)	Union			
1981	Kerang	20.19 (139) - 12.12 (74)	Union			
1982	Union	12.12 (84) - 11.9 (75)	Koondrook			
1983	Kerang	13.15 (93) - 8.11 (59)	Cohuna			
1984	Kerang	18.7 (115) - 15.12 (102)	Union			
1985	Kerang	17.15 (117) - 5.7 (37)	Cohuna			
1986	Cohuna	23.21 (159) - 7.1 (43)	Union			
1987	Kerang	14.12 (96) - 9.7 (61)	Union			
1988	Union	19.11 (125) - 6.13 (49)	Pyramid Hill			
1989	Leitchville	18.4 (112) - 16.12 (108)	Union			
