= Golden Rivers Football League =

Australian rules football organisation

Golden Rivers Football Netball League
- Formerly: Kerang District FA (1919 - 1944) & Kerang & District FL (1946 - 1997)
- Sport: Australian rules football Netball
- Founded: 1919
- Folded: 2025
- COO: Jessie Chester
- President: Donald Willox
- Country: Australia
- Last champion: Hay (2025)
- Sponsor: GrainCorp
- Website: grfnl.com.au

The Golden Rivers Football Netball League (GRFNL) was an Australian rules football and netball competition that was based in north-central Victoria and the western Riverina area of New South Wales.

== History ==
The league, formed in 1919, was known as the Kerang and District Football Association until 1944. In 1946, the league was re-established as the Kerang and District Football League.

In 1998, the league changed its name to the Golden Rivers Football League at the direction of the Victorian Country Football League to better reflect its expansion beyond the immediate Kerang area.

The league was disbanded at the end of the 2025 season due to a declining number of clubs.

== Clubs ==
The league finished with six clubs from towns in Victoria and New South Wales. All football clubs fielded seniors, reserves, under 18 and under 15 teams. All netball clubs fielded A grade, B grade, B reserve, C grade, 17 and under and 14 and under teams.

=== Final Clubs ===
Club	Colours	Nickname	Home Ground	Former League	Est.	Years in GRFNL	GRFNL Senior Premierships		Fate
Club	Colours	Nickname	Home Ground	Former League	Est.	Years in GRFNL	Total	Years	Fate
Hay		Lions	Hay Recreation Reserve, Hay, New South Wales	MMFL	1937	1981–2025	5	1982, 1992, 1995, 2023, 2025	Moved to Central Murray FL in 2026
Macorna		Tigers	Macorna Recreation Reserve, Macorna, Victoria	LFA	c.1880s	1945–2025	8	1947, 1948, 1951, 1952, 1953, 1960, 1962, 1970	Moved to Loddon Valley FL in 2026
Moulamein		Swans	Moulamein Recreation Reserve, Moulamein, New South Wales	ERFL	c.1940s	1958–2025	2	1961, 1988	Moved to Central Murray FL in 2026
Murrabit		Blues	Murrabit Recreation Reserve, Murrabit, Victoria	KDFA	1919	1947–2025	12	1949, 1958, 1963, 1965, 1966, 1967, 1968, 1969, 1999, 2005, 2007, 2016	Moved to Central Murray FL in 2026
Ultima		Roos	Ultima Recreation Reserve, Ultima, Victoria	TFL	1910	1979–2025	11	1981, 1983, 1991, 1994, 1996, 2002, 2003, 2004, 2014, 2015, 2024	Moved to Central Murray FL in 2026
Wandella		Bombers	Wandella Recreation Reserve, Wandella, Victoria	LFA	1922	1945–2025	14	1955, 1956, 1957, 1959, 1977, 1979, 1985, 1986, 1993, 2008, 2009, 2010, 2011, 2017	Moved to Central Murray FL in 2026

=== Former ===
Club	Colours	Nickname	Home Ground	Former League	Est.	Years in GRFNL	GRFNL Senior Premierships		Fate
Club	Colours	Nickname	Home Ground	Former League	Est.	Years in GRFNL	Total	Years	Fate
Appin		Grasshoppers	Appin Recreation Reserve, Appin	LFA	1910s	1945–1995	2	1964, 1987	Merged with Kerang Rovers to form Kerang Rovers-Appin in Northern & Echuca FL in 1996
Boort		Magpies	Boort Park, Boort	KFL	1889	1945–1946, 1950	1	1950	Played in Korong FL between 1947 and 1949. Moved to North Central FL in 1951
Kerang		Blues	Riverside Park, Kerang	NDFL	1927	1945–1946	1	1946	Moved to Northern District FL in 1947
Kerang Rovers		Magpies	Alexandra Park, Kerang	KDFA	c.1900s	1949–1990	3	1954, 1971, 1975	Merged with Kerang in Northern & Echuca FL in 1991
Koondrook		Tigers	Koondrook Recreation Reserve, Koondrook	KDFA	1919	1945–1946	0	–	Moved to Northern District FL in 1947
Lakes		Bulldogs	Mystic Park Recreation Reserve, Mystic Park	–	1940s	1947–1949, 1953–1985	1	1972	1950–52 unknown. Folded after 1985 season
Nullawil		Maroons	Nullawil Recreation Reserve, Nullawil	MFL	c.1900s	1998–2022	7	1998, 2000, 2001, 2012, 2018, 2019, 2022	Moved to North Central FL in 2023
Quambatook		Saints	Quambatook Recreation Reserve, Quambatook	MMFL	c.1910s	1945–1946, 1973–2022	5	1945, 1973, 1974, 1984, 1997	Moved to Northern District FL in 1947. Folded after 2022 season
Wakool	(1958–1979)(1980–2010)(2011–2018)	Hawks	Wakool Recreation Reserve, Wakool	ERFL	c.1900s	1958–2015, 2017–2018	7	1976, 1978, 1980, 1989, 1990, 2006, 2013	Recess in 2016. Folded in 2018

== Premiers ==
- 1945 QUAMBATOOK
- 1946 KERANG
- 1947 MACORNA
- 1948 MACORNA
- 1949 MURRABIT
- 1950 BOORT
- 1951 MACORNA
- 1952 MACORNA
- 1953 MACORNA
- 1954 KERANG ROVERS
- 1955 WANDELLA
- 1956 WANDELLA
- 1957 WANDELLA
- 1958 MURRABIT
- 1959 WANDELLA
- 1960 MACORNA
- 1961 MOULAMEIN
- 1962 MACORNA
- 1963 MURRABIT
- 1964 APPIN
- 1965 MURRABIT
- 1966 MURRABIT
- 1967 MURRABIT
- 1968 MURRABIT
- 1969 MURRABIT
- 1970 MACORNA
- 1971 KERANG ROVERS
- 1972 LAKES
- 1973 QUAMBATOOK
- 1974 QUAMBATOOK
- 1975 KERANG ROVERS
- 1976 WAKOOL
- 1977 WANDELLA
- 1978 WAKOOL
- 1979 WANDELLA
- 1980 WAKOOL
- 1981 ULTIMA
- 1982 HAY
- 1983 ULTIMA
- 1984 QUAMBATOOK
- 1985 WANDELLA
- 1986 WANDELLA
- 1987 APPIN
- 1988 MOULAMEIN
- 1989 WAKOOL
- 1990 WAKOOL
- 1991 ULTIMA
- 1992 HAY
- 1993 WANDELLA
- 1994 ULTIMA
- 1995 HAY
- 1996 ULTIMA
- 1997 QUAMBATOOK
- 1998 NULLAWIL
- 1999 MURRABIT
- 2000 NULLAWIL
- 2001 NULLAWIL
- 2002 ULTIMA
- 2003 ULTIMA
- 2004 ULTIMA
- 2005 MURRABIT
- 2006 WAKOOL
- 2007 MURRABIT
- 2008 WANDELLA
- 2009 WANDELLA
- 2010 WANDELLA
- 2011 WANDELLA
- 2012 NULLAWIL
- 2013 WAKOOL
- 2014 ULTIMA
- 2015 ULTIMA
- 2016 MURRABIT
- 2017 WANDELLA
- 2018 NULLAWIL
- 2019 NULLAWIL
- 2020 League in recess due to COVID-19 pandemic
- 2021 Finals not played due to COVID-19 pandemic
- 2022 NULLAWIL
- 2023 HAY
- 2024 ULTIMA
- 2025 HAY

== E.G Hunt Medallion ==
The E.G Hunt Medallion is awarded to the Best and Fairest player of the Senior Football competition.

Year	Player	Year	Player
1947	Marsh Long (Macorna)	1987	Wayne Ladson (Macorna)
1948	Marsh Long (Macorna)	1988	Evan Eilson (Ultima)
1949	Marsh Long (Macorna)	1989	Robert Styles (Hay)
1950	Marsh Long (Macorna)	1990	Greg Turbill (Hay)
1951	Vince Kelly (Rovers)	1991	Warren Maher (Wakool)
1952	Keith Morrison (Murrabit)	1992	Royce Simpson (Hay)
1953	Marsh Long (Macorna)	1993	Shane Ingram (Ultima)
1954	Marsh Long (Macorna)	1994	Roger Smith (Wakool)
1955	Linton Mills (Macorna)	1995	Terry Blake (Wakool)
1956	Athol Livingston (Wandella)	1996	Des Smith (Hay)
1957	Jack Findlay (Macorna)	1997	Brian Theizs (Quambatook)
1958	Jack Findlay (Macorna)	1998	Matt Champerlain (Wandella)
1959	Charles Peach (Moulamein) Cliff Mowat (Macorna)	1999	Dean Young (Ultima)
1960	Barry Doran (Moulamein)	2000	Grant Caelli (Nullawil)
1961	John Wishart (Macorna)	2001	Des Smith (Hay)
1962	John Maloni (Wakool)	2002	Mat Fleming (Murrabit)
1963	Stuart Robertson (Murrabit)	2003	Luke O'Toole (Ultima)
1964	Graham Clark (Moulamein)	2004	Glenn Smith (Nullawil)
1965	Bruce Robinson (Wakool)	2005	Luke O'Toole (Ultima)
1966	Jim Sheldon (Macorna)	2006	Josh Bode (Nullawil)
1967	Leon Whelan (Moulamein)	2007	Glenn Smith (Nullawil)
1968	William Proud (Wandella)	2008	Will Callow (Wandella)
1969	Leon Whelan (Moulamein)	2009	Luke Maher (Quambatook) Michael Rowe (Macorna)
1970	Leon Whelan (Moulamein)	2010	Dain Hayes (Murrabit) Luke Maher (Quambatook)
1971	Barry Taylor (Wandella)	2011	Wayne Mitrovic (Macorna) Scott Mathiaske (Nullawil)
1972	Robin Taylor (Rovers)	2012	Wayne Mitrovic (Macorna)
1973	Ian Pay (Appin)	2013	Luke O'Toole (Ultima)
1974	Ian Prendergast (Appin)	2014	Thomas Isma (Ultima)
1975	Bill Zeldenryk (Appin)	2015	Brodie Bennett (Quambatook)
1976	Ian Prendergast (Rovers)	2016	Bryden Morrison (Murrabit)
1977	Ian Prendergast (Rovers)	2017	Justin Robinson (Wandella)
1978	Mark Newell (Wakool)	2018	Andrew Oberdofer (Nullawil) Daniel Watts (Nullawil)
1979	Claude Jackson (Moulamein) Ian Prendergast (Appin)	2019	Thomas Isma (Moulamein) Jackson Ferguson (Hay)
1980	Peter Crawford (Rovers)	2020	League Cancelled due to COVID-19
1981	Neil Byers (Macorna)	2021	Matt Quigley (Nullawil)
1982	Neil Byers (Macorna)	2022	Ricky Wild (Quambatook)
1983	Peter Evans (Moulamein)	2023	Heath Moloney (Moulamein)
1984	Barry Prendergast (Appin)	2024	Jack Cattanach (Hay)
1985	Eddie Redfern (Hay)	2025	Jacob Watson (Hay)
1986	Bryan Livingston (Wandella)		

== Leading Goal Kickers ==
Year	Player	H&A goals	Finals goals	Total Goals
1952	Cliff Mowat (Macorna)	41	0	41
1953	Don Poyner (Macorna)	60	0	60
1954	Don Poyner (Macorna)	39	0	39
1955	0	0	0	0
1956	0	0	0	0
1957	0	0	0	0
1958	0	0	0	0
1959	J Wishart (Macorna)	60	0	60
1960	Max Major (Murrabit)	59	3	62
1961	Max Major (Murrabit)	85	7	92
1962	Max Major (Murrabit)	72	9	81
1963	Max Major (Murrabit)	57	3	60
1964	Stewart Robertson (Murrabit)	49	3	52
1965	Max Major (Murrabit)	75	5	80
1966	Stewart Robertson (Murrabit)	66	11	77
1967	0	0	0	0
1968	Spike Laursen (Murrabit)	66	4	70
1969	Laurie Plowman (Appin)	67	0	67
1970	0	0	0	0
1971	Terry Bennett (Lakes)	74	0	74
1972	0	0	0	0
1973	T Green (Wakool)	47	0	47
1974	Lionel Ritchie (Quambatook)	63	0	63
1975	T Green (Wakool)	55	0	55
1976	B Liningston (Wakool)	86	0	86
1977	L Whelan (Wakool)	90	0	90
1978	P Evans (Moulemein)	53	0	53
1979	Steven Strevens (Ultima)	132	0	132
1980	Darren Troy (Appin)	80	7	87
1981	Brian Findlay (Ultima)	93	21	114
1982	Ian Prendergast (Appin)	83	5	88
1983	Steven Strevens (Ultima)	105	19	124
1984	Steven Strevens (Lakes)	87	0	87
1985	Steven Strevens (Ultima)	131	3	134
1986	Andrew Moore (Kerang Rovers)	106	0	106
1987	Gary MacGillavray (Appin)	60	14	74
1988	Peter Johnson (Macorna)	75	6	81
1989	Stephen (Rowdy) Arthur (Wakool)	76	10	86
1990	Stephen (Rowdy) Arthur (Wakool)	87	7	94
1991	Dean Farrell (Ultima)	83	8	91
1992	Andrew Stevens (Hay)	122	7	129
1993	Ricky Lavercombe (Wakool)	69	2	71
1994	Jayson Aylett (Hay)	81	6	87
1995	Ian Collinson (Moulemein)	77	11	88
1996	Doug Sutherland (Murrabit)	46	7	53
1997	Neil McCallum (Hay)	85	0	85
1998	Tony Doran (Nullawil)	96	9	105
1999	Tony Doran (Nullawil)	97	8	105
2000	Tony Doran (Nullawil)	89	7	96
2001	Tony Doran (Nullawil)	81	3	84
2002	Tony Doran (Nullawil)	77	1	78
2003	Brad Carroll (Ultima)	119	9	128
2004	Tony Doran (Nullawil)	101	14	115
2005	Nathan Henry (Murrabit)	104	9	113
2006	Shane Harvey (Wakool)	96	20	116
2007	Shane Harvey (Wakool)	100	7	107
2008	Nathan Henry (Murrabit)	84	0	84
2009	Sean Bedggood (Nullawil)	71	13	84
2010	Sean Bedggood (Nullawil)	91	3	94
2011	Dean McGowan (Murrabit)	72	4	76
2012	Daniel Needs (Macorna)	52	1	53
2013	Luke Kirkland (Wakool)	73	5	78
2014	Luke Kirkland (Wakool)	89	3	92
2015	Kallen Heslop (Nullawil)	56	4	60
2016	Nathan Henry (Murrabit	56	5	61
2017	Kallen Heslop (Nullawil)	80	6	86
2018	Arnold Kirby (Ultima)	84	6	90
2019	Jack O'Rourke (Ultima)	80	6	86
2020	League in Recess due to COVID-19	0	0	0
2021	Jaydon Stiles (Macorna)	56	0	56
2022	Mitch Farmer (Nullawil)	76	11	87
2023	Damian Cupido (Murrabit)	52	0	52
2024	Ryan Deveruex (Ultima)	59	3	62
2025	Jack Headon (Hay)	64	4	68

== 2019 Ladder ==
Golden Rivers	Wins	Losses	Draws	For	Against	%	Pts	Final	Team	G	B	Pts	Team	G	B	Pts
Ultima	14	1	1	1788	859	208.15%	58	1st Semi	Wandella	12	22	94	Hay	9	5	59
Nullawil	14	2	0	1890	784	241.07%	56	2nd Semi	Ultima	18	9	117	Nullawil	12	9	81
Wandella	12	3	1	1825	811	225.03%	50	Preliminary	Nulliwal	12	11	83	Wandella	12	5	77
Hay	8	8	0	1433	1280	111.95%	32	Grand	Ultima	13	10	88	Nulliwal	17	12	114
Moulamein	8	8	0	1250	1175	106.38%	32									
Murrabit	5	11	0	1067	1378	78.78%	20									
Quambatook	2	14	0	784	1969	48.23%	8									
Macorna	0	16	0	557	2338	23.82%	0									

== 2021 Ladder ==
Golden Rivers	Wins	Losses	Draws	For	Against	%	Pts	Final	Team	G	B	Pts	Team	G	B	Pts
Nullawil	11	0	0	1634	478	341.84%	44	1st Semi	Cancelled	0	0	0	Cancelled	0	0	0
Wandella	8	3	0	961	861	111.26%	32	2nd Semi	Cancelled	0	0	0	Cancelled	0	0	0
Quambatook	7	4	0	984	793	124.09%	28	Preliminary	Cancelled	0	0	0	Cancelled	0	0	0
Moulamein	7	4	0	915	1071	85.43%	28	Grand	Cancelled	0	0	0	Cancelled	0	0	0
Hay	5	6	0	853	885	96.38%	20									
Murrabit	3	8	0	698	1002	78.78%	20									
Macorna	2	9	0	778	1177	66.10%	8									
Ultima	1	10	0	605	1161	52.11%	4									

== 2022 Ladder ==
Golden Rivers	Wins	Losses	Draws	For	Against	%	Pts	Final	Team	G	B	Pts	Team	G	B	Pts
Nullawil	15	1	0	2328	638	364.89%	60	1st Semi	Wandella	9	6	60	Moulamein	15	14	104
Quambatook	13	3	0	1528	1020	149.80%	52	2nd Semi	Nullawil	18	15	123	Quambatook	7	4	46
Wandella	10	6	0	1250	1115	112.11%	40	Preliminary	Quambatook	10	8	68	Moulamein	10	15	75
Moulamein	10	6	0	1342	1306	102.76%	40	Grand	Nullawil	16	18	114	Moulamein	7	4	46
Macorna	7	9	0	1265	1569	80.62%	28									
Murrabit	4	12	0	955	1574	62.08%	16									
Hay	3	13	0	955	1574	60.67%	12									
Ultima	2	14	0	904	1752	51.60%	8									

== 2023 Ladder ==
Golden Rivers	Wins	Losses	Draws	For	Against	%	Pts	Final	Team	G	B	Pts	Team	G	B	Pts
Ultima	15	1	0	1475	845	174.56%	60	1st Semi	Hay	21	16	142	Macorna	6	16	52
Moulamein	12	4	0	1503	1081	139.04%	48	2nd Semi	Ultima	14	11	95	Moulamein	7	9	51
Hay	10	6	0	1288	1025	125.66%	40	Preliminary	Moulamein	6	8	44	Hay	12	7	79
Macorna	5	11	0	1130	1322	85.48%	20	Grand	Ultima	6	16	52	Hay	11	15	81
Wandella	4	12	0	922	1297	71.09%	16									
Murrabit	2	14	0	886	1634	54.22%	8									

== 2024 Ladder ==
Golden Rivers	Wins	Losses	Draws	For	Against	%	Pts	Final	Team	G	B	Pts	Team	G	B	Pts
Hay	15	1	0	1831	595	307.73%	60	1st Semi	Wandella	19	9	123	Macorna	3	6	24
Ultima	14	2	0	1568	643	243.86%	56	2nd Semi	Hay	14	17	101	Ultima	7	10	52
Wandella	8	8	0	1123	1335	84.12%	32	Preliminary	Ultima	19	19	133	Wandella	4	1	25
Macorna	5	11	0	928	1503	61.74%	20	Grand	Hay	11	9	75	Ultima	11	10	76
Moulamein	3	13	0	810	1425	56.84%	12									
Murrabit	3	13	0	763	1522	50.13%	12									

== 2025 Ladder ==
Golden Rivers	Wins	Losses	Draws	For	Against	%	Pts	Final	Team	G	B	Pts	Team	G	B	Pts
Hay	15	1	0	1831	595	307.73%	60	1st Semi	Moulamein	16	11	107	Murrabit	10	14	74
Ultima	14	2	0	1568	643	243.86%	56	2nd Semi	Hay	12	16	88	Ultima	10	3	63
Moulamein	8	8	0	1123	1335	84.12%	32	Preliminary	Ultima	14	14	98	Moulamein	5	7	37
Murrabit	5	11	0	928	1503	61.74%	20	Grand	Hay	10	18	78	Ultima	9	10	64
Wandella	3	13	0	810	1425	56.84%	12									
Macorna	1	15	0	763	1522	50.13%	12									

== See also ==
- Group 20 Rugby League
