= Echuca Football Club =

Australian rules football and netball club

Echuca

Names
- Full name: Echuca Football Netball Club
- Nickname: Murray Bombers

Club details
- Founded: 1874; 152 years ago
- Colours: Green White
- Competition: Goulburn Valley Football League
- President: A. Byrne
- Premierships: (17): EDFA: 1890, 1902; NDFA: 1901; BFL: 1928, 1967, 1970; EFL: 1946, 1947, 1948; GVFL: 1977, 1979, 1997, 2001, 2002, 2022, 2023, 2024, 2026
- Ground: Victoria Park Oval

Uniforms
Home

Other information
- Official website: https://echucafnc.com.au/

The Echuca Football Netball Club, nicknamed the Murray Bombers, is an Australian rules football and netball club based in the Victorian town of Echuca, Victoria.

== History ==
The Echuca Football Club was formed in 1874, so it could play against the Rochester Football Club which was also formed in 1874.

Echuca initially wore the blue and white colours.

In 1890, Echuca won the trophy, then in 1891, Echuca East Football Club won the trophy, then in 1892, Rochester won the initial premiership and Echuca protested, which resulted in the two teams having to play a grand final match. Rochester refused to play, with Echuca travelling over to Rochester to play, but with no competing team, Echuca claimed the premiership match, after the first bounce. After much discussion, Echuca was officially declared premiers.

Echuca played many matches against East Echuca Football Club in the mid to late 1890s.

The club teams currently compete in the Goulburn Valley Football League (GVFL), having initially joined in 1909. Echuca also played in the Bendigo Football League, from 1925 until 1939, then from 1949 until they returned to the GVFL in 1974.

Echuca played in the Echuca Football League from 1946 to 1948, winning three consecutive premierships, before returning to the Bendigo Football League.

Echuca changed its club colours to green and white in March, 1953.

One well known ex-player is former Victorian police officer Ron Iddles.

== Competitions Timelines ==
- 1890 - 1892 - Echuca District Football Association (Aitken Trophy)
- 1894 - 19?? - Northern Football Association (Upton Trophy)
- 1909 - 1923 - Goulburn Valley Football League
- 1924 - 1939 - Bendigo Football League
- 1940 - 1944 - Club in recess. World War Two
- 1945 - 1948 - Echuca Football League
- 1949 - 1973 - Bendigo Football League
- 1974 - Present - Goulburn Valley Football League

== Football Premierships ==
Seniors

League	Total flags	Premiership years	Runner Up
Echuca District FA	4	1890,,1892, 1893 1902	1891
Northern District FA	1	1901,	
Bendigo Football League	3	1928, 1967, 1970	1950
Echuca Football League	3	1946, 1947, 1948	1945
Goulburn Valley Football League	8	1977, 1979, 1997, 2001, 2002, 2022, 2023, 2024	1909, 1910, 1911, 1976, 1987, 1994, 1995, 2003, 2019.

Reserves

- Bendigo Football League
  - 1969
- Goulburn Valley Football League
  - 1975, 1976, 1977, 1978, 1995, 1996, 2007, 2022, 2024

Thirds

- Goulburn Valley Football League
  - 1976, 1994, 2008, 2018, 2019, 2022, 2023, 2024

Echuca East Football Club

- Echuca Football Association
  - 1891
- Northern District Football Association
  - 1894, 1895

== Football League best & fairest winners ==
Seniors

- Bendigo Football League: Michelsen Medal
  - 1954 - Eddie Jackson
  - 1963 - Bob Vagg
  - 1965 - Bill Serong
- Goulburn Valley Football League: Morrison Medal
  - 1986 - B.A. Kennaugh
  - 1995 - Simon Eishold
  - 1997 - Steven Orr
  - 2001 - Craig Sholl
  - 2003 - Rhys Archard
  - 2006 - Colin Durie
  - 2010 - Kristian Height
  - 2016 - Simon Buckley
  - 2017 - Ben McGay

Reserves

- Bendigo Football League
  - 1960 - Len Johnston
  - 1961 - Paul Egan & Robert Egan
  - 1963 - Noel Wallace

== Senior Football Coaches ==
Year	Coach
1947-50	Brian Randall
1994-98	Simon Eishold
1999	Rod O'Reilly
2000-01	Ken Sheldon
2023-04	Coen Yin
2005-06	Dylan Butler
2007-08	Steven Orr
2009-11	Brett Henderson
2012-13	Cameron Stewart
2014–2017	Andrew Briggs
2018–2020	Simon Maddox &
	Andrew Walker
2021–2024	Andrew Walker

== AFL players ==
- Clayton Oliver- Melbourne
- Noah Long- West Coast Eagles
- Ollie Wines- Port Adelaide
- Andrew Walker- Carlton
- Brodie Kemp- Carlton
