= Bill MacDonald (footballer) =

Australian rules footballer, born 1906

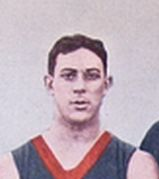

Personal information
- Full name: W. A. "Bill" MacDonald
- Born: 7 March 1906
- Died: 24 July 1973 (aged 67)
- Original teams: Deniliquin, Stawell

Playing career^{1}
Years	Club	Games (Goals)
1929–31	Melbourne	32 (3)
- ^{1} Playing statistics correct to the end of 1931.

Bill MacDonald (7 March 1906 – 24 July 1973) was an Australian rules footballer who played with Melbourne in the Victorian Football League (VFL).

MacDonald played in back to back premierships for the Colts Football Club in the Deniliquin Football Association in 1925 and 1926, prior to playing with Stawell.

MacDonald was also an accomplished runner who finished 3rd in the 1925 Stawell Gift. MacDonald was favorite for the 1928 Stawell Gift, but was beaten in his semi final. He also won the 1924 Stratford Gift and 1928 Horsham Gift.
