= Edward River Football League =

Australian rules football league

- Most recent season or competition: 1961
- Sport: Australian rules football
- Founded: 1946
- Folded: 1961
- No. of teams: 6 (1961), 11 (historical)
- Country: Australia
- Last champion: West End (1961)
- Related competitions: Deniliquin FA; Murray FL

The Edward River Football League was an Australian rules football competition based around the town of Deniliquin in south-west New South Wales.

== History ==
The Edward River Football League was formed in 1946 by the Deniliquin Football Club in order to foster the growth of senior footballers in the town and surrounds. Initial clubs were Mathoura, North Deniliquin, East End and West End. In 1948 Mathoura returned to the Echuca FL and were replaced by a newly formed club at Conargo. Mathoura returned a year later and along with the newly-formed club Blighty gave the ERFL 6 teams. Mathoura departed again after 1951 and were replaced by Hay from the South West District FL. The 1953 grand final between West and North was won when West's Dave Charles kicked a goal after the siren, giving them a 5-point lead.

The competition began to expand outside Deniliquin in 1954 with the admission of Moulamein. A year later they would be joined by Pretty Pine and Wakool to form an 8-team competition for the first time. Tensions over travel distances rose between the town and country clubs, resulting in Moulamein and Wakool departing for the Kerang & District FL in 1958. By the 1960s many of the clubs had begun to struggle with numbers. North and Pretty Pine merged before the 1961 season to combat this, however it proved to be a short lived solution. North-Pine and Conargo both found themselves unable to form teams in 1962. Hay departed for the Barellan & District FL and Blighty for the Murray FL, forcing the only two remaining clubs, East and West, to fold.

== Clubs ==
=== Final ===
Club	Colours	Nickname	Home Ground	Former league	Est.	Years in ERFL	ERFL Senior Premierships		Fate
Club	Colours	Nickname	Home Ground	Former league	Est.	Years in ERFL	Total	Years	Fate
Blighty		Redeyes	Blighty Recreation Reserve, Blighty	MFL	1949	1949-1955, 1959–1961	0	–	Played in Murray FL reserves between 1956 and 1958, returned there in 1962
Conargo	(1940s)(?-1958)(1959–61)	Billabongs	Conargo Recreation Reserve, Conargo	–	1948	1948-1961	0	–	Folded after 1961 season
East End		Maroons	Memorial Oval, Deniliquin	DFA	1911	1946-1961	3	1950, 1951, 1960	Folded after 1961 season
Hay		Rovers	Hay Recreation Reserve, Hay	SWDFL	1937	1952-1961	0	–	Moved to Barellan & District FL in 1962
North-Pine			Pretty Pine Recreation Reserve, Pretty Pine	–	1961	1961	0	–	Folded after 1961 season
West End		Magpies	Memorial Oval, Deniliquin	DFA	1920	1946-1961	6	1947, 1948, 1953, 1958, 1959, 1961	Folded after 1961 season

=== Former ===
Club	Colours	Nickname	Home Ground	Former league	Est.	Years in ERFL	ERFL Senior Premierships		Fate
Club	Colours	Nickname	Home Ground	Former league	Est.	Years in ERFL	Total	Years	Fate
Mathoura	(1946–47)(1949)(1950–51)	Timbercutters, Village	Mathoura Recreation Reserve, Mathoura	EFL	1902	1946-1947, 1949–1951	2	1946, 1949	Played in Echuca FL in 1948 and returned there in 1952
Moulamein		Tigers	Moulamein Recreation Reserve, Moulamein	NDFA	1948	1954-1957	2	1955, 1957	Moved to Kerang & District FL in 1958
North Deniliquin		Northerners, Flood Water Men	Memorial Oval, Deniliquin	DFA	1899	1946-1960	2	1952, 1954	Merged with Pretty Pine to form North-Pine in 1961
Pretty Pine		Pine	Pretty Pine Recreation Reserve, Pretty Pine	–	1955	1955-1960	0	–	Merged with North Deniliquin to form North-Pine in 1961
Wakool			Wakool Recreation Reserve, Wakool	W&DFA	1900s	1955-1957	0	–	Moved to Kerang & District FL in 1958

== Premierships ==
Year	Premier	Score	Runners-up	Notes
1946	Mathoura	7.15 (57) - 2.16 (28)	North	
1947	West		East	
1948	West	13.11 (89) - 8.5 (53)	East	
1949	Mathoura	4.8 (32) - 2.10 (22)	East	
1950	East	12.8 (80) - 8.7 (55)	Mathoura	
1951	East	12.9 (81) - 5.8 (38)	North	
1952	North	9.13 (67) - 5.17 (47)	West	
1953	West	10.12 (72) - 10.7 (67)	North	
1954	North		East	
1955	Moulamein	13.12 (90) - 6.10 (46)	North	
1956	?			
1957	Moulamein	8.11 (59) - 6.10 (46)	East	
1958	West	10.10 (70) - 7.16 (58)	Hay	
1959	West	Margin 2 points	East	
1960	East	8.17 (65) - 7.7 (49)	Blighty	
1961	West	8.6 (54) - 4.9 (33)	Hay	
