= Central Wheatbelt Football League =

Central Wheatbelt Football League
Established	1968
Teams	5
2026 premiers	Bencubbin
Most premierships	14 – Beacon
Website	official website

The Central Wheatbelt Football League is an Australian rules football competition in the Wheatbelt region of Western Australia.

== History ==
The Central Wheatbelt Football League (CWFL) was formed at the end of the 1967 football season following a merger of the Dampier Football Association and the Koorda-Wyalkatchem Football Association. The Dampier Football Association (1913–1967) had clubs that included Bencubbin, Kununoppin, Mukinbudin. Nungarin, Trayning, & Yelbeni.

The Koorda-Wyalkatchem Football Association (1958–1967) was an amalgamation of the Koorda Football Association (1929–1957) which had clubs included Gabbin, Cadoux, Booralaming and the Wyalkatchem Football Association (1923–1957) with clubs included Benjabbering, Korrelocking, Wyalkatchem and Yorkrakine

== Clubs ==
=== Locations ===
Locations of the 2025 Central Wheatbelt FL clubs

=== Current ===
Club	Colours	Nickname	Home ground	Former League	Est.	Years in CWFL	Premierships	
Club	Colours	Nickname	Home ground	Former League	Est.	Years in CWFL	Total	Years
Beacon		Bombers	Beacon Town Oval, Beacon	DFA		1968-1969, 1976-	14	1979, 1980, 1986, 1989, 1991, 1992, 1993, 1994, 1995, 1996, 1997, 1999, 2000, 2009
Bencubbin		Demons	Bencubbin Oval, Bencubbin	DFA	1920	1968-	7	1985, 1987, 1988, 2001, 2002, 2013, 2026
Kalannie		Bulldogs	Kalannie Town Oval, Kalannie	CMFL		1984-	9	2003, 2004, 2005, 2011, 2016, 2022, 2023, 2024, 2025
Koorda		Kangaroos	Koorda Showgrounds, Koorda	KWFA	1921	1968-	8	1984, 2008, 2010, 2012, 2014, 2017, 2019, 2021
Mukinbudin		Rams	Mukinbudin Oval, Mukinbudin	–	1969	1969–	10	1969, 1976, 1977, 1978, 1981, 1998, 2006, 2007, 2015, 2018

=== Former ===
Club	Colours	Nickname	Home ground	Former League	Est.	Years in CWFL	Premierships		Fate
Club	Colours	Nickname	Home ground	Former League	Est.	Years in CWFL	Total	Years	Fate
Benjaberring				KWFA		1968-1969	0	-	Absorbed by Wyalkatchem in 1970
Booralaming				KWFA		1968-1976	0	-	Folded
Korrelocking				KWFA		1968–1973	0	-	Folded
Kununoppin			Kununoppin Oval, Kununoppin	DFA		1968	0	-	Merged with Trayning to form Towns in 1969
North Mukinbudin			Mukinbudin Oval, Mukinbudin	DFA		1968	0	-	Merged with South Mukinbudin to form Mukinbudin in 1969
Nungarin			Nungarin Oval, Nungarin	EDFL		1970–1990	1	1982	Absorbed Towns to form Nungarin & Towns in 1991
Nungarin & Towns		Panthers	Nungarin Oval, Nungarin	–	1991	1991, 2006–2021	0	-	Entered recess in 1992, returned in 2006. Folded in 2022
South Mukinbudin			Mukinbudin Oval, Mukinbudin	DFA		1968	0	-	Merged with North Mukinbudin to form Mukinbudin in 1969
Southern Cross		Bombers	Southern Cross Oval, Southern Cross	EDFL		1987–1991	1	1990	Returned to Eastern Districts FL in 1992
Towns			Kununoppin Oval, Kununoppin	–	1969	1969–1990	4	1971, 1973, 1974, 1983	Absorbed by Nungarin to form Nungarin & Towns in 1991
Trayning			Trayning Oval, Trayning	DFA		1968	0	-	Merged with Kununoppin to form Towns in 1969
Wyalkatchem		Bulldogs	Wyalkatchem Oval, Wyalkatchem	KWFA		1968–1975	4	1968, 1970, 1972, 1975	Moved to Mortlock FL in 1976

== Grand final results ==
Year	Premiers	Score	Runners up	Score
1968	Wyalkatchem	5.9 (39)	Kununoppin	3.6 (24)
1969	Mukinbudin	8.11 (59)	Booralaming	7.11 (53)
1970	Wyalkatchem	13.21 (99)	Towns	9.9 (63)
1971	Towns		Booralaming	
1972	Wyalkatchem	10.16 (76)	Towns	10.10 (70)
1973	Towns	9.11 (65)	Bencubbin	7.9 (51)
1974	Towns	13.10 (88)	Wyalkatchem	11.18 (84)
1975	Wyalkatchem	6.14 (50)	Mukinbudin	5.12 (42)
1976	Mukinbudin	16.16 (112)	Towns	8.11 (59)
1977	Mukinbudin	16.14 (110)	Nungarin	10.4 (64)
1978	Mukinbudin	16.16 (112)	Towns	8.11 (59)
1979	Beacon	17.10 (112)	Towns	7.11 (53)
1980	Beacon	12.8 (80)	Mukinbudin	9.12 (66)
1981	Mukinbudin	14.9 (93)	Beacon	3.10 (28)
1982	Nungarin	15.17 (107)	Towns	9.22 (76)
1983	Towns	19.15 (129)	Beacon	14.14 (98)
1984	Koorda	22.18 (150)	Beacon	9.12 (66)
1985	Bencubbin	13.10 (88)	Beacon	12.12 (84)
1986	Beacon		Mukinbudin	
1987	Bencubbin	21.19 (145)	Beacon	19.14 (128)
1988	Bencubbin	26.18 (174)	Beacon	10.11 (71)
1989	Beacon	14.10 (94)	Bencubbin	9.11 (65)
1990	Southern Cross	22.12 (144)	Beacon	12.8 (80)
1991	Beacon	14.14 (98)	Southern Cross	8.9 (57)
1992	Beacon	13.20 (98)	Koorda	12.8 (80)
1993	Beacon	16.9 (105)	Bencubbin	7.8 (50)
1994	Beacon	19.16 (130)	Mukinbudin	12.6 (78)
1995	Beacon	14.10 (94)	Bencubbin	13.6 (84)
1996	Beacon	12.15 (87)	Koorda	4.15 (39)
1997	Beacon	17.10 (112)	Koorda	14.10 (94)
1998	Mukinbudin	10.5 (65)	Beacon	6.14 (50)
1999	Beacon	19.19 (133)	Kalannie	3.7 (25)
2000	Beacon	17.11 (113)	Bencubbin	14.8 (92)
2001	Bencubbin	19.17 (131)	Beacon	8.11 (59)
2002	Bencubbin	9.6 (60)	Beacon	7.15 (57)
2003	Kalannie	16.6 (102)	Beacon	4.9 (33)
2004	Kalannie	10.12 (72)	Mukinbudin	7.8 (50)
2005	Kalannie	20.15 (135)	Mukinbudin	7.7 (49)
2006	Mukinbudin	16.17 (113)	Bencubbin	10.9 (69)
2007	Mukinbudin	12.15 (87)	Koorda	8.12 (60)
2008	Koorda	14.14 (98)	Beacon	14.11 (95)
2009	Beacon	17.28 (130)	Nungarin Towns	10.6 (66)
2010	Koorda	9.13 (67)	Beacon	9.12 (66)
2011	Kalannie	13.13 (91)	Koorda	13.7 (85)
2012	Koorda	18.11 (119)	Bencubbin	7.16 (58)
2013	Bencubbin	12.8 (80)	Kalannie	10.4 (64)
2014	Koorda	18.16 (124)	Mukinbudin	12.14 (86)
2015	Mukinbudin	13.9 (87)	Kalannie	11.11 (77)
2016	Kalannie	8.3 (51)	Bencubbin	5.7 (37)
2017	Koorda	14.9 (93)	Kalannie	10.5 (65)
2018	Mukinbudin	12.11 (83)	Bencubbin	8.11 (59)
2019	Koorda	28.11 (179)	Mukinbudin	10.7 (67)
2020	Covid			
2021	Koorda	23.12 (150)	Mukinbudin	5.17 (47)
2022	Kalannie	15.13 (103)	Koorda	7.9 (51)
2023	Kalannie	14.11 (95)	Beacon	7.2 (44)
2024	Kalannie	14.18 (102)	Beacon	4.4 (28)
2025	Kalannie	7.8 (50)	Beacon	4.6 (30)
2026	Bencubbin	9.19 (73)	Kalannie	5.6 (36)

== Ladders ==
=== 2006 ladder ===
Central Wheatbelt	Wins	Byes	Losses	Draws	For	Against	%	Pts	Final	Team	G	B	Pts	Team	G	B	Pts
Mukinbudin	13	0	2	0	1622	855	189.71%	52	1st semi	Koorda	13	8	86	Kalannie	10	13	73
Bencubbin	11	0	4	0	2054	1067	192.50%	44	2nd semi	Bencubbin	12	15	87	Mukinbudin	8	15	63
Kalannie	9	0	6	0	1804	944	191.10%	36	Preliminary	Mukinbudin	17	17	119	Koorda	11	7	73
Koorda	9	0	6	0	1761	1128	156.12%	36	Grand	Mukinbudin	16	17	113	Bencubbin	10	9	69
Beacon	3	0	12	0	1254	1641	76.42%	12									
Towns	0	0	15	0	301	3161	9.52%	0									

=== 2007 ladder ===
Central Wheatbelt	Wins	Byes	Losses	Draws	For	Against	%	Pts	Final	Team	G	B	Pts	Team	G	B	Pts
Mukinbudin	12	0	3	0	1721	1197	143.78%	48	1st semi	Kalannie	16	11	107	Bencubbin	6	11	47
Kalannie	10	0	5	0	1584	1082	146.40%	40	2nd semi	Mukinbudin	18	13	121	Koorda	15	10	100
Koorda	10	0	5	0	1572	1211	129.81%	40	Preliminary	Koorda	15	9	99	Kalannie	8	14	62
Bencubbin	6	0	9	0	1254	1285	97.59%	24	Grand	Mukinbudin	12	15	87	Koorda	8	12	60
Beacon	5	0	10	0	1177	1795	65.57%	20									
Towns	2	0	13	0	1191	1929	61.74%	8									

=== 2008 ladder ===
Central Wheatbelt	Wins	Byes	Losses	Draws	For	Against	%	Pts	Final	Team	G	B	Pts	Team	G	B	Pts
Beacon	12	0	2	0	1715	886	193.57%	48	1st semi	Kalannie	18	16	124	Mukinbudin	6	10	46
Koorda	10	0	4	0	1501	908	165.31%	40	2nd semi	Beacon	19	22	136	Koorda	9	9	63
Kalannie	9	0	5	0	1865	923	202.06%	36	Preliminary	Koorda	16	12	108	Kalannie	13	9	87
Mukinbudin	6	0	8	0	1045	1293	80.82%	24	Grand	Koorda	14	14	98	Beacon	14	11	95
Nungarin & Towns	5	0	9	0	988	1605	61.56%	20									
Bencubbin	0	0	14	0	731	2230	32.78%	0									

=== 2009 ladder ===
Central Wheatbelt	Wins	Byes	Losses	Draws	For	Against	%	Pts	Final	Team	G	B	Pts	Team	G	B	Pts
Beacon	15	0	0	0	2373	755	314.30%	60	1st semi	Koorda	9	12	66	Nungarin & Towns	12	14	86
Kalannie	11	0	4	0	1741	1246	139.73%	44	2nd semi	Beacon	20	13	133	Kalannie	6	6	42
Koorda	7	0	8	0	1415	1502	94.21%	28	Preliminary	Nungarin & Towns	11	14	80	Koorda	9	10	64
Nungarin & Towns	6	0	9	0	1294	1591	81.33%	24	Grand	Beacon	17	28	130	Nungarin & Towns	10	6	66
Mukinbudin	3	0	12	0	1055	1844	57.21%	12									
Bencubbin	3	0	12	0	1079	2019	53.44%	12									

=== 2010 ladder ===
Central Wheatbelt	Wins	Byes	Losses	Draws	For	Against	%	Pts	Final	Team	G	B	Pts	Team	G	B	Pts
Beacon	14	0	1	0	2028	845	240.00%	56	1st semi	Mukinbudin	14	7	91	Kalannie	9	17	71
Koorda	10	0	5	0	1527	1116	136.83%	40	2nd semi	Beacon	14	16	100	Koorda	10	12	72
Kalannie	9	0	6	0	1417	1084	130.72%	36	Preliminary	Koorda	13	14	92	Mukinbudin	11	12	78
Mukinbudin	7	0	8	0	1524	1134	134.39%	28	Grand	Koorda	9	13	67	Beacon	9	12	66
Bencubbin	5	0	10	0	1196	1465	81.64%	20									
Nungarin & Towns	0	0	15	0	709	2757	25.72%	0									

=== 2011 ladder ===
Central Wheatbelt	Wins	Byes	Losses	Draws	For	Against	%	Pts	Final	Team	G	B	Pts	Team	G	B	Pts
Kalannie	14	0	1	0	1895	678	279.50%	56	1st semi	Bencubbin	15	17	107	Mukinbudin	12	20	92
Koorda	11	0	4	0	1811	986	183.67%	44	2nd semi	Kalannie	14	9	93	Koorda	6	16	52
Bencubbin	7	0	8	0	1614	1373	117.55%	28	Preliminary	Koorda	11	23	89	Bencubbin	11	14	80
Mukinbudin	7	0	8	0	1281	1498	85.51%	28	Grand	Kalannie	13	13	91	Koorda	13	7	85
Beacon	6	0	9	0	1186	1556	76.22%	24									
Nungarin & Towns	0	0	15	0	814	2510	32.43%	0									

=== 2012 ladder ===
Central Wheatbelt	Wins	Byes	Losses	Draws	For	Against	%	Pts	Final	Team	G	B	Pts	Team	G	B	Pts
Kalannie	12	0	3	0	1779	883	201.47%	48	1st semi	Koorda	19	11	125	Mukinbudin	7	15	57
Bencubbin	11	0	4	0	1870	1125	166.22%	44	2nd semi	Bencubbin	20	14	134	Kalannie	8	14	62
Koorda	10	0	5	0	1662	1056	157.39%	40	Preliminary	Koorda	14	15	99	Kalannie	15	7	97
Mukinbudin	6	0	9	0	1492	1119	133.33%	24	Grand	Koorda	18	11	119	Bencubbin	7	16	58
Beacon	6	0	9	0	1374	1409	97.52%	24									
Nungarin & Towns	0	0	15	0	465	3050	15.25%	0									

=== 2013 ladder ===
Central Wheatbelt	Wins	Byes	Losses	Draws	For	Against	%	Pts	Final	Team	G	B	Pts	Team	G	B	Pts
Kalannie	13	0	2	0	2114	809	261.31%	52	1st semi	Bencubbin	10	15	75	Mukinbudin	6	12	48
Koorda	11	0	4	0	1777	873	203.55%	44	2nd semi	Kalannie	21	16	142	Koorda	3	6	24
Mukinbudin	10	0	5	0	1844	1465	125.87%	40	Preliminary	Bencubbin	14	13	97	Koorda	9	17	71
Bencubbin	7	0	8	0	1479	1535	96.35%	28	Grand	Bencubbin	12	8	80	Kalannie	10	4	64
Beacon	3	0	12	0	1023	1789	57.18%	12									
Nungarin & Towns	1	0	14	0	852	2636	32.32%	4									

=== 2014 ladder ===
Central Wheatbelt	Wins	Byes	Losses	Draws	For	Against	%	Pts	Final	Team	G	B	Pts	Team	G	B	Pts
Koorda	13	0	2	0	2201	844	260.78%	52	1st semi	Mukinbudin	18	13	121	Beacon	11	16	82
Kalannie	11	0	4	0	1705	1004	169.82%	44	2nd semi	Koorda	21	21	147	Kalannie	13	4	82
Mukinbudin	10	0	5	0	1860	1115	166.82%	40	Preliminary	Mukinbudin	21	18	144	Kalannie	8	7	55
Beacon	8	0	7	0	1815	1197	151.63%	32	Grand	Koorda	18	16	124	Mukinbudin	12	14	86
Bencubbin	3	0	12	0	839	2039	41.15%	12									
Nungarin & Towns	0	0	15	0	681	2902	23.47%	0									

=== 2015 ladder ===
Central Wheatbelt	Wins	Byes	Losses	Draws	For	Against	%	Pts	Final	Team	G	B	Pts	Team	G	B	Pts
Kalannie	14	0	1	0	1880	854	220.14%	56	1st semi	Mukinbudin	17	22	124	Koorda	10	6	66
Beacon	9	0	6	0	1526	1164	131.10%	36	2nd semi	Kalannie	18	21	129	Beacon	11	7	73
Mukinbudin	9	0	6	0	1583	1399	113.15%	36	Preliminary	Mukinbudin	20	13	133	Beacon	16	16	112
Koorda	7	0	8	0	1377	1374	100.22%	28	Grand	Mukinbudin	13	9	87	Kalannie	11	11	77
Bencubbin	5	0	10	0	1080	1440	75.00%	20									
Nungarin & Towns	1	0	14	0	1124	2339	48.05%	4									

=== 2016 ladder ===
Central Wheatbelt	Wins	Byes	Losses	Draws	For	Against	%	Pts	Final	Team	G	B	Pts	Team	G	B	Pts
Koorda	12	0	2	0	1371	998	137.37%	48	1st semi	Bencubbin	15	14	104	Beacon	12	9	81
Kalannie	10	0	5	0	1464	902	162.31%	40	2nd semi	Kalannie	14	7	91	Koorda	6	5	41
Beacon	7	0	8	0	1303	1232	105.76%	28	Preliminary	Bencubbin	13	11	89	Koorda	8	17	65
Bencubbin	7	0	7	0	1138	1110	102.52%	28	Grand	Kalannie	8	3	51	Bencubbin	5	7	37
Mukinbudin	6	0	9	0	1106	1292	85.60%	24									
Nungarin & Towns	2	0	13	0	1042	1890	55.13%	8									

=== 2017 ladder ===
Central Wheatbelt	Wins	Byes	Losses	Draws	For	Against	%	Pts	Final	Team	G	B	Pts	Team	G	B	Pts
Koorda	12	0	3	0	1490	931	160.04%	48	1st semi	Mukinbudin	11	8	74	Beacon	6	9	45
Kalannie	11	0	4	0	1323	964	137.24%	44	2nd semi	Kalannie	9	11	65	Koorda	4	2	26
Beacon	9	0	5	1	1115	1140	97.81%	38	Preliminary	Koorda	17	8	110	Mukinbudin	8	7	55
Mukinbudin	8	0	7	0	1271	1242	102.33%	32	Grand	Koorda	14	9	93	Kalannie	10	5	65
Bencubbin	3	0	12	0	1028	1321	77.82%	12									
Nungarin & Towns	1	0	13	1	1061	1690	62.78%	6									

=== 2018 ladder ===
Central Wheatbelt	Wins	Byes	Losses	Draws	For	Against	%	Pts	Final	Team	G	B	Pts	Team	G	B	Pts
Bencubbin	11	0	3	1	1174	828	141.79%	46	1st semi	Mukinbudin	10	12	72	Beacon	10	3	63
Koorda	11	0	4	0	1331	843	157.89%	44	2nd semi	Bencubbin	9	16	70	Koorda	10	9	69
Mukinbudin	10	0	4	1	1582	701	225.68%	42	Preliminary	Mukinbudin	17	5	107	Koorda	15	8	98
Beacon	7	0	8	0	740	1029	71.91%	28	Grand	Mukinbudin	12	11	83	Bencubbin	8	11	59
Kalannie	5	0	10	0	1178	1126	104.62%	20									
Nungarin & Towns	0	0	15	0	236	1714	13.77%	0									

=== 2019 ladder ===
Central Wheatbelt	Wins	Byes	Losses	Draws	For	Against	%	Pts	Final	Team	G	B	Pts	Team	G	B	Pts
Koorda	15	0	0	0	2059	616	334.25%	60	1st semi	Beacon	13	7	85	Kalannie	6	10	46
Mukinbudin	11	0	4	0	1633	1129	144.64%	44	2nd semi	Koorda	14	13	97	Mukinbudin	10	3	63
Kalannie	7	0	8	0	1304	1192	109.40%	28	Preliminary	Mukinbudin	11	9	75	Beacon	11	6	72
Beacon	6	0	9	0	1318	1134	116.23%	24	Grand	Koorda	28	11	179	Mukinbudin	10	7	67
Bencubbin	6	0	9	0	1249	1336	93.49%	24									
Nungarin & Towns	0	0	15	0	591	2856	20.69%	0									
