= Esperance District Football Association =

Australian rules football league

- Sport: Australian rules football
- First season: 1956
- No. of teams: 4
- Most recent champion: Esperance (2026)
- Most titles: Esperance – 31

The Esperance District Football Association is an Australian rules football league based in the city of Esperance in Western Australia. It was formed in 1956.

== History ==
In 1956 after many years of playing scrimmage matches between Esperance and Grass Patch a decision was made to create a football association. The first decision was to create two new football clubs. Gibson Football Club was created by excess players from the Esperance club and Salmon Gums was from surplus players from Grass Patch.

The first season was dominated by the Southern teams. Gibson won eleven out of twelve games followed by Esperance win nine wins. Grass Patch won four while Salmon Gums went winless. Gibson were the first premiers.

In 1957 saw the merger of Salmon Gums and Grass Patch, the new entity was called The Mallee. The association continued with three teams until the inclusion of Newtown in 1958.

The league has fielded a women's competition since 2019.

== Clubs ==
=== Locations ===
Locations of the 2025 Esperance District FA clubs

=== Current ===
Club	Jumper	Nickname	Home Ground	Former League	Est.	Years in EDFA	Premierships	
Club	Jumper	Nickname	Home Ground	Former League	Est.	Years in EDFA	Total	Years
Esperance		Bulldogs	Esperance Oval, Nulsen	–	1937	1956–	31	1957, 1958, 1959, 1961, 1962, 1964, 1965, 1967, 1970, 1971, 1972, 1974, 1976, 1977, 1987, 1988, 1999, 2000, 2001, 2005, 2007, 2012, 2013, 2014, 2015, 2016, 2017, 2021, 2024, 2025, 2026
Gibson		Tigers	Gibson Oval, Gibson	–	1956	1956–	18	1956, 1979, 1980, 1981, 1982, 1984, 1985, 1986, 1989, 1990, 1991, 1992, 2002, 2006, 2008, 2018, 2019, 2023
Newtown Condingup		Lions	Newtown Oval, Bandy Creek and Condingup Oval, Condingup	–	2005	2005–	2	2009, 2022
Ports		Blues	Ports Oval, Esperance	–	1966	1966–	12	1973, 1975, 1978, 1993, 1996, 1997, 1998, 2003, 2004, 2010, 2011, 2020

=== Former ===
Club	Jumper	Nickname	Home Ground	Former League	Est.	Years in EDFA	Premierships		Fate
Club	Jumper	Nickname	Home Ground	Former League	Est.	Years in EDFA	Total	Years	Fate
Condingup	(1982-?)(?-2004)	Cougars	Condingup Oval, Condingup	–	1982	1982–2004	0	-	Merged with Newtown to form Newtown-Condingup in 2005
Grass Patch			Grass Patch Oval, Grass Patch	MFA		1956	0	-	Merged with Salmon Gums to form The Mallee in 1957
Newtown	(1970s)(1980s)(?-2004)	Demons	Newtown Oval, Bandy Creek	–	1958	1958–2004	7	1960, 1963, 1966, 1968, 1969, 1994, 1995	Merged with Condingup to form Newtown-Condingup in 2005
Norseman		Vikings	Norseman Oval, Norseman	GFL	1971	1983–1995	1	1983	Folded after 1995 season
Munglinup		Demons	Munglinup Oval, Munglinup	RDFA	1957	1983–1987	0	-	Returned to Ravensthorpe & Districts FA in 1988
Ravensthorpe		Tigers	Ravensthorpe Oval, Ravensthorpe	NPFA	1962	1966-1967	0	-	Formed Ravensthorpe & Districts FA in 1968
Salmon Gums			Grass Patch Oval, Grass Patch	–	1956	1956	0	-	Merged with Grass Patch to form The Mallee in 1957
The Mallee			Grass Patch Oval, Grass Patch	–	1957	1957–1965	0	-	Folded after 1965 season

== 2020 Ladder ==
Esperance	Wins	Byes	Losses	Draws	For	Against	%	Pts	Final	Team	G	B	Pts	Team	G	B	Pts
Esperance	7	0	2	0	702	453	154.97%	28	1st Semi	Gibson	7	7	49	Newtown Condingup	5	15	45
Ports	6	0	2	1	717	492	145.73%	26	2nd Semi	Esperance	15	1	91	Ports	5	15	45
Gibson	3	0	5	1	404	601	67.22%	14	Preliminary	Ports	14	8	92	Gibson	7	5	47
Newtown Condingup	1	0	8	0	404	681	59.32%	4	Grand	Ports	15	10	100	Esperance	4	10	34

== 2021 Ladder ==
Esperance	Wins	Byes	Losses	Draws	For	Against	%	Pts	Final	Team	G	B	Pts	Team	G	B	Pts
Esperance	11	0	1	0	989	648	152.62%	44	1st Semi	Ports	8	6	54	Newtown Condingup	7	4	46
Gibson	7	0	5	0	865	636	136.01%	28	2nd Semi	Gibson	9	11	65	Esperance	4	12	36
Newtown Condingup	3	0	9	0	753	865	87.05%	12	Preliminary	Esperance	15	14	104	Ports	6	7	43
Ports	3	0	9	0	668	1126	59.33%	12	Grand	Esperance	11	9	75	Gibson	10	11	71

== 2022 Ladder ==
Esperance	Wins	Byes	Losses	Draws	For	Against	%	Pts	Final	Team	G	B	Pts	Team	G	B	Pts
Esperance	11	0	1	0	1473	453	325.17%	44	1st Semi	Gibson	14	10	94	Ports	5	7	37
Newtown Condingup	7	0	5	0	923	836	110.41%	28	2nd Semi	Esperance	9	11	65	Newtown Condingup	5	11	41
Gibson	6	0	6	0	896	796	112.56%	24	Preliminary	Newtown Condingup	10	8	68	Gibson	10	6	66
Ports	0	0	12	0	313	1520	20.59%	0	Grand	Newtown Condingup	8	7	55	Esperance	4	15	39

== 2023 Ladder ==
Esperance	Wins	Byes	Losses	Draws	For	Against	%	Pts	Final	Team	G	B	Pts	Team	G	B	Pts
Gibson	10	0	2	0	1052	388	271.13%	40	1st Semi	Ports	12	7	79	Newtown Condingup	8	7	55
Esperance	10	0	2	0	1050	569	184.53%	40	2nd Semi	Gibson	15	11	101	Esperance	2	7	19
Newtown Condingup	2	0	10	0	581	1022	56.85%	8	Preliminary	Esperance	12	16	88	Ports	4	3	27
Ports	2	0	10	0	357	1061	33.65%	8	Grand	Gibson	15	5	95	Esperance	5	8	38
