= Eastern Districts Football League =

Eastern Districts Football League
Established	1960
Teams	8
2026 premiers	Kulin-Kondinin
Most premierships	12 – Nukarni

The Eastern Districts Football League is an Australian rules football league based in the eastern Wheatbelt region of Western Australia. The league stretches from Southern Cross in the east, Hyden in the south, Corrigin in the west and Nukarni in the north.

== History ==
The Eastern Districts Football League (EDFL) was formed in 1960 after a merger of the Merredin Football Association (MFA) and the Bruce Rock-Narembeen Football Association (BRNFA).

Teams from the MFA included Baandee, Burracoppin, Muntagdin, Nukarni, Merredin Railways and Merredin Towns.

Teams from the BRNFA included Bruce Rock, Narembeen Rovers, Narembeen Warriors and Shackleton.

In 1963, the two Narembeen clubs – Rovers and Warriors – merged to form a single Narembeen club.

In 1966, the league expanded with the inclusion of a new club from Southern Cross.

In 1971, Corrigin and Kondinin joined the league from the disbanded Corrigin Football Association.

In 1974, Merredin Towns and Baandee merged to form Merredin Lions.

In 1983, Hyden-Karlgarin and Kulin joined the league from the disbanded Lake Grace-Kulin Districts Football League

In 2005, Kulin and Kondinin merged to form Kulin-Kondinin Blues.

== Clubs ==
=== Locations ===
Locations of the 2025 Eastern Districts FL clubs

== Current ==
Club	Colours	Nickname	Home ground	Former League	Est.	Years in EDFL	Premierships	
Club	Colours	Nickname	Home ground	Former League	Est.	Years in EDFL	Total	Years
Bruce Rock		Magpies	Bruce Rock Oval, Bruce Rock	BRNFA	1912	1960–	4	1965, 1977, 2000, 2017
Burracoppin		Cats	Burracoppin Oval, Burracoppin and Merredin Oval, Merredin	MFA	1923	1960–	5	1981, 1988, 1989, 1991, 1992
Corrigin		Tigers	Corrigin Oval, Corrigin	CFA		1971–	4	1976, 1996, 2012, 2025
Hyden-Karlgarin		Saints	Hyden Oval, Hyden	LGKDFA	1971	1983–	6	2002, 2003, 2005, 2014, 2021, 2022
Kulin-Kondinin		Blues	Kulin Town Oval, Kulin and Kondinin Sporting Complex, Kondinin	–	2005	2005–	8	2006, 2008, 2010, 2011, 2013, 2015, 2016, 2018, 2026
Narembeen		Hawks	Narembeen Oval, Narembeen	–	1963	1963–	9	1969, 1970, 1972, 1974, 1998, 1999, 2007, 2009, 2023
Nukarni		Demons	Merredin Oval, Merredin	MFA	1923	1960–	12	1961, 1962, 1963, 1966, 1968, 1986, 1987, 1990, 1993, 1994, 1995, 2019
Southern Cross		Bombers	Southern Cross Oval, Southern Cross	CWFL		1966–1986, 1992–	3	2001, 2020, 2024

== Former clubs ==
Club	Colours	Nickname	Home ground	Former League	Est.	Years in EDFL	Premierships		Fate
Club	Colours	Nickname	Home ground	Former League	Est.	Years in EDFL	Total	Years	Fate
Baandee		Tigers	Baandee Oval, Baandee	MFA		1960–1973	0	-	Merged with Merredin Towns to form Merredin in 1974
Kondinin		Bulldogs	Kondinin Sports Complex, Kondinin	CFA		1971–2004	5	1973, 1978, 1979, 1980, 1997	Merged with Kulin to form Kulin-Kondinin in 2005
Kulin		Roos	Kulin Town Oval, Kulin	LGKDFA		1983–2004	3	1984, 1985, 2004	Merged with Kondinin to form Kulin-Kondinin in 2005
Merredin		Lions	Merredin Oval, Merredin	–	1974	1974–1995	3	1975, 1982, 1983	Folded after 1995 season
Merredin Centrals (Railways 1960-68)			Merredin Oval, Merredin	MFA		1960–1970	0	-	Folded after 1970 season
Merredin Towns			Merredin Oval, Merredin	MFA		1960–1973	1	1971	Merged with Baandee to form Merredin in 1974
Muntadgin			Muntagdin Oval, Muntadgin	MFA		1960–1969	0	-	Folded after 1969 season
Narembeen Rovers	Dark with light monogram	Rovers	Narembeen Oval, Narembeen	BRNFA		1960–1962	0	-	Merged with Warriors to form Narembeen in 1963
Narembeen Warriors	Light with dark vee	Warriors	Narembeen Oval, Narembeen	BRNFA		1960–1962	1	1960	Merged with Rovers to form Narembeen in 1963
Nungarin			Nungarin Oval, Nungarin	DFA		1967–1969	0	-	Reserves only. Moved to Central Wheatbelt FL in 1970
Shackleton			Shackleton Oval, Shackleton	BRNFA		1960–1970	2	1964, 1967	Folded after 1970 season

== Grand final results ==
Year	Premiers	Score	Runners up	Score
1960	Narembeen Warriors	11.10 (76)	Bruce Rock	8.10 (58)
1961	Nukarni	15.9 (99)	Bruce Rock	13.12 (90)
1962	Nukarni	15.13 (103)	Bruce Rock	12.14 (86)
1963	Nukarni	18.14 (122)	Bruce Rock	10.9 (69)
1964	Shackleton	11.15 (81)	Nukarni	6.6 (42)
1965	Bruce Rock	10.14 (74)	Nukarni	8.6 (54)
1966	Nukarni	9.12 (66)	Shackleton	7.8 (50)
1967	Shackleton	11.12 (78)	Bruce Rock	10.10 (70)
1968	Nukarni	5.7 (37)	Shackleton	3.3 (21)
1969	Narembeen	11.15 (81)	Nukarni	9.10 (64)
1970	Narembeen	11.12 (78)	Merredin Towns	8.11 (59)
1971	Merredin Towns	15.11 (101)	Narembeen	13.14 (92)
1972	Narembeen	21.17 (143)	Nukarni	8.8 (56)
1973	Kondinin	11.13 (79)	Nukarni	4.7 (31)
1974	Narembeen	12.17 (89)	Merredin	9.8 (62)
1975	Merredin	14.9 (93)	Narembeen	6.7 (43)
1976	Corrigin	16.9 (105)	Merredin	13.14 (92)
1977	Bruce Rock	16.11 (107)	Kondinin	13.11 (89)
1978	Kondinin	19.12 (126)	Bruce Rock	12.11 (83)
1979	Kondinin	8.18 (66)	Bruce Rock	7.13 (55)
1980	Kondinin	19.8 (122)	Merredin	12.10 (82)
1981	Burracoppin	18.14 (122)	Merredin	10.12 (72)
1982	Merredin	11.15 (81)	Nukarni	9.14 (68)
1983	Merredin	11.17 (83)	Nukarni	9.8 (62)
1984	Kulin	23.18 (156)	Merredin	3.16 (34)
1985	Kulin		Burracoppin	
1986	Nukarni	9.6 (60)	Burracoppin	8.8 (56)
1987	Nukarni	10.16 (76)	Burracoppin	7.7 (49)
1988	Burracoppin	21.15 (141)	Nukarni	11.13 (79)
1989	Burracoppin	12.8 (80)	Nukarni	6.11 (47)
1990	Nukarni	8.12 (60)	Burracoppin	8.11 (59)
1991	Burracoppin	14.11 (95)	Nukarni	3.7 (25)
1992	Burracoppin	12.12 (84)	Nukarni	8.16 (64)
1993	Nukarni	20.9 (129)	Hyden-Karlgarin	12.10 (82)
1994	Nukarni	15.14 (104)	Kondinin	10.9 (69)
1995	Nukarni	15.7 (97)	Kondinin	6.12 (48)
1996	Corrigin	16.10 (106)	Nukarni	10.7 (67)
1997	Kondinin	15.9 (99)	Narembeen	11.17 (83)
1998	Narembeen	11.12 (78)	Kondinin	11.9 (75)
1999	Narembeen	19.15 (129)	Bruce Rock	6.13 (49)
2000	Bruce Rock	22.12 (144)	Hyden-Karlgarin	9.11 (65)
2001	Southern Cross	16.9 (105)	Hyden-Karlgarin	16.7 (103)
2002	Hyden-Karlgarin	16.10 (106)	Narembeen	11.3 (69)
2003	Hyden-Karlgarin	7.6 (48)	Kondinin	5.5 (35)
2004	Kulin	15.11 (101)	Burracoppin	12.6 (78)
2005	Hyden-Karlgarin	17.11 (113)	Narembeen	9.8 (62)
2006	Kulin-Kondinin	18.15 (123)	Narembeen	13.8 (86)
2007	Narembeen	23.13 (151)	Kulin-Kondinin	10.6 (66)
2008	Kulin-Kondinin	17.13 (115)	Narembeen	12.11 (83)
2009	Narembeen	15.11 (101)	Kulin-Kondinin	12.11 (83)
2010	Kulin-Kondinin	11.13 (79)	Narembeen	6.8 (44)
2011	Kulin-Kondinin	11.21 (87)	Narembeen	10.11 (71)
2012	Corrigin	13.9 (87)	Kulin-Kondinin	9.12 (66)
2013	Kulin-Kondinin	26.18 (174)	Hyden-Karlgarin	8.10 (58)
2014	Hyden-Karlgarin	14.12 (96)	Kulin-Kondinin	9.11 (65)
2015	Kulin-Kondinin	17.11 (113)	Nukarni	6.15 (51)
2016	Kulin-Kondinin	12.11 (83)	Bruce Rock	10.14 (74)
2017	Bruce Rock	13.12 (90)	Corrigin	9.9 (63)
2018	Kulin-Kondinin	14.6 (90)	Bruce Rock	6.10 (46)
2019	Nukarni	11.20 (86)	Kulin-Kondinin	12.7 (79)
2020	Southern Cross	15.10 (100)	Hyden-Karlgarin	9.9 (63)
2021	Hyden-Karlgarin	15.15 (105)	Narrembeen	14.10 (94)
2022	Hyden-Karlgarin	7.14 (56)	Kulin-Kondinin	3.4 (22)
2023	Narembeen	11.5 (71)	Hyden-Karlgarin	7.7 (49)
2024	Southern Cross	17.5 (107)	Narembeen	7.11 (53)
2025	Corrigin	10.7 (67)	Southern Cross	10.6 (66)
2026	Kulin-Kondinin	12.4 (76)	Burracoppin	10.8 (68)

== Ladders ==
=== 2009 ladder ===
Eastern Districts	Wins	Byes	Losses	Draws	For	Against	%	Pts	Final	Team	G	B	Pts	Team	G	B	Pts
Narembeen	13	0	1	0	2103	616	341.40%	52	1st semi	Nukarni	20	16	136	Hyden/Karlgarin	7	8	50
Kulin/Kondinin	12	0	2	0	1769	734	241.01%	48	2nd semi	Kulin/Kondinin	19	12	126	Narembeen	9	8	62
Hyden/Karlgarin	10	0	4	0	1351	982	137.58%	40	Preliminary	Narembeen	22	20	152	Nukarni	4	8	32
Nukarni	9	0	5	0	1201	1077	111.51%	36	Grand	Narembeen	15	11	101	Kulin/Kondinin	12	11	83
Corrigin	4	0	10	0	1197	1561	76.68%	16									
Bruce Rock	3	0	11	0	834	1636	50.98%	12									
Southern Cross	3	0	11	0	828	1765	46.91%	12									
Burracoppin	2	0	12	0	698	1620	43.09%	8									

=== 2010 ladder ===
Eastern Districts	Wins	Byes	Losses	Draws	For	Against	%	Pts	Final	Team	G	B	Pts	Team	G	B	Pts
Kulin/Kondinin	14	0	0	0	3489	652	535.12%	56	1st semi	Narembeen	11	12	78	Corrigin	10	13	73
Burracoppin	10	0	4	0	1347	1029	130.90%	40	2nd semi	Kulin/Kondinin	18	8	116	Burracoppin	5	6	36
Corrigin	9	0	5	0	1188	1346	88.26%	36	Preliminary	Narembeen	15	11	101	Burracoppin	11	11	77
Narembeen	7	0	7	0	1197	1879	63.70%	28	Grand	Kulin/Kondinin	11	13	79	Narembeen	6	8	44
Bruce Rock	6	0	8	0	1101	2773	39.70%	24									
Southern Cross	4	0	10	0	1005	1330	75.56%	16									
Nukarni	4	0	10	0	843	1347	62.58%	16									
Hyden/Karlgarin	2	0	12	0	1787	1601	111.62%	8									

=== 2011 ladder ===
Eastern Districts	Wins	Byes	Losses	Draws	For	Against	%	Pts	Final	Team	G	B	Pts	Team	G	B	Pts
Corrigin	12	0	2	0	1460	720	202.78%	48	1st semi	Kulin/Kondinin	15	9	99	Burracoppin	9	9	63
Narembeen	10	0	4	0	1424	941	151.33%	40	2nd semi	Narembeen	12	8	80	Corrigin	11	5	71
Kulin/Kondinin	9	0	4	0	1429	906	157.73%	36	Preliminary	Kulin/Kondinin	14	11	95	Corrigin	14	10	94
Burracoppin	9	0	4	0	1282	932	137.55%	36	Grand	Kulin/Kondinin	11	21	87	Narembeen	10	11	71
Nukarni	7	0	7	0	1140	934	122.06%	28									
Southern Cross	4	0	10	0	928	1150	80.70%	16									
Hyden/Karlgarin	4	0	10	0	910	1492	60.99%	16									
Bruce Rock	0	0	14	0	437	1935	22.58%	0									

=== 2012 ladder ===
Eastern Districts	Wins	Byes	Losses	Draws	For	Against	%	Pts	Final	Team	G	B	Pts	Team	G	B	Pts
Nukarni	10	0	4	0	1252	849	147.47%	40	1st semi	Kulin/Kondinin	15	8	98	Burracoppin	10	6	66
Corrigin	10	0	4	0	1337	919	145.48%	40	2nd semi	Corrigin	13	10	88	Nukarni	3	2	20
Kulin/Kondinin	10	0	4	0	1488	1031	144.33%	40	Preliminary	Kulin/Kondinin	19	16	130	Nukarni	11	7	73
Burracoppin	7	0	6	1	1045	1073	97.39%	30	Grand	Corrigin	13	9	87	Kulin/Kondinin	9	12	66
Narembeen	7	0	7	0	1115	1115	100.00%	28									
Southern Cross	5	0	9	0	1109	1352	82.03%	20									
Bruce Rock	5	0	9	0	1093	1374	79.55%	20									
Hyden/Karlgarin	1	0	12	1	953	1676	56.86%	6									

=== 2013 ladder ===
Eastern Districts	Wins	Byes	Losses	Draws	For	Against	%	Pts	Final	Team	G	B	Pts	Team	G	B	Pts
Kulin/Kondinin	13	0	1	0	1544	899	171.75%	52	1st semi	Hyden/Karlgarin	17	10	112	Corrigin	7	10	52
Nukarni	10	0	4	0	1186	918	129.19%	40	2nd semi	Kulin/Kondinin	14	15	99	Nukarni	11	3	69
Hyden/Karlgarin	10	0	4	0	1485	1263	117.58%	40	Preliminary	Hyden/Karlgarin	18	15	123	Nukarni	17	11	113
Corrigin	8	0	6	0	1188	1026	115.79%	32	Grand	Kulin/Kondinin	26	18	174	Hyden/Karlgarin	8	10	58
Southern Cross	7	0	7	0	1314	1329	98.87%	28									
Narembeen	4	0	10	0	1136	1244	91.32%	16									
Burracoppin	4	0	10	0	964	1253	76.94%	16									
Bruce Rock	0	0	14	0	907	1792	50.61%	0									

=== 2014 ladder ===
Eastern Districts	Wins	Byes	Losses	Draws	For	Against	%	Pts	Final	Team	G	B	Pts	Team	G	B	Pts
Kulin/Kondinin	13	0	1	0	1906	647	294.59%	52	1st semi	Hyden/Karlgarin	16	13	109	Narembeen	12	7	79
Nukarni	11	0	3	0	1385	729	189.99%	44	2nd semi	Kulin/Kondinin	27	19	181	Nukarni	2	2	14
Hyden/Karlgarin	11	0	3	0	1649	872	189.11%	44	Preliminary	Hyden/Karlgarin	13	11	89	Nukarni	11	2	68
Narembeen	9	0	5	0	1380	664	207.83%	36	Grand	Hyden/Karlgarin	14	12	96	Kulin/Kondinin	9	11	65
Bruce Rock	6	0	8	0	934	1199	77.90%	24									
Corrigin	4	0	10	0	962	1150	83.65%	16									
Southern Cross	2	0	12	0	549	1870	29.36%	8									
Burracoppin	0	0	14	0	315	1949	16.16%	0									

=== 2015 ladder ===
Eastern Districts	Wins	Byes	Losses	Draws	For	Against	%	Pts	Final	Team	G	B	Pts	Team	G	B	Pts
Kulin/Kondinin	13	0	1	0	2051	553	370.89%	52	1st semi	Bruce Rock	12	17	89	Hyden/Karlgarin	6	8	44
Nukarni	11	0	3	0	1329	698	190.40%	44	2nd semi	Kulin/Kondinin	14	11	95	Nukarni	9	8	62
Bruce Rock	10	0	4	0	1408	998	141.08%	40	Preliminary	Hyden/Karlgarin	20	11	131	Bruce Rock	6	6	42
Hyden/Karlgarin	9	0	5	0	1236	1159	106.64%	36	Grand	Kulin/Kondinin	17	11	113	Nukarni	6	15	51
Narembeen	6	0	8	0	910	1233	73.80%	24									
Corrigin	3	0	11	0	860	1344	63.99%	12									
Southern Cross	3	0	11	0	894	1600	55.88%	12									
Burracoppin	1	0	15	0	508	1611	31.53%	4									

=== 2016 ladder ===
Eastern Districts	Wins	Byes	Losses	Draws	For	Against	%	Pts	Final	Team	G	B	Pts	Team	G	B	Pts
Kulin/Kondinin	12	0	2	0	1675	685	244.53%	48	1st semi	Southern Cross	12	9	81	Hyden/Karlgarin	6	22	58
Bruce Rock	9	0	4	1	1493	1070	139.53%	38	2nd semi	Kulin/Kondinin	23	14	152	Bruce Rock	8	10	58
Southern Cross	9	0	4	1	1081	1068	101.22%	38	Preliminary	Bruce Rock	12	10	82	Southern Cross	6	12	48
Hyden/Karlgarin	9	0	5	0	1509	1047	144.13%	36	Grand	Kulin/Kondinin	12	11	83	Bruce Rock	10	14	74
Corrigin	8	0	6	0	1195	1054	113.38%	32									
Burracoppin	4	0	10	0	808	1318	61.31%	16									
Nukarni	4	0	10	0	768	1457	52.71%	16									
Narembeen	0	0	14	0	717	1547	46.35%	0									

=== 2017 ladder ===
Eastern Districts	Wins	Byes	Losses	Draws	For	Against	%	Pts	Final	Team	G	B	Pts	Team	G	B	Pts
Bruce Rock	14	0	0	0	1744	621	280.84%	56	1st semi	Kulin/Kondinin	10	9	69	Narembeen	9	9	63
Corrigin	11	0	3	0	1604	800	200.50%	44	2nd semi	Bruce Rock	15	8	98	Corrigin	7	9	51
Kulin/Kondinin	10	0	4	0	1239	862	143.74%	40	Preliminary	Corrigin	22	11	143	Kulin/Kondinin	12	9	81
Narembeen	7	0	7	0	1135	1079	105.19%	28	Grand	Bruce Rock	13	12	90	Corrigin	9	9	63
Southern Cross	7	0	7	0	1047	1417	73.89%	28									
Nukarni	3	0	11	0	797	1203	66.25%	12									
Hyden/Karlgarin	3	0	11	0	946	1479	63.96%	12									
Burracoppin	1	0	13	0	617	1668	36.99%	4									

=== 2018 ladder ===
Eastern Districts	Wins	Byes	Losses	Draws	For	Against	%	Pts	Final	Team	G	B	Pts	Team	G	B	Pts
Bruce Rock	13	0	1	0	1508	620	243.23%	52	1st semi	Kulin/Kondinin	14	8	92	Southern Cross	9	15	69
Kulin/Kondinin	10	0	4	0	1255	815	153.99%	40	2nd semi	Bruce Rock	19	10	124	Kulin/Kondinin	9	4	58
Southern Cross	9	0	5	0	1265	906	139.62%	36	Preliminary	Kulin/Kondinin	12	9	81	Nukarni	10	10	70
Nukarni	8	0	6	0	970	935	103.74%	32	Grand	Kulin/Kondinin	14	6	90	Bruce Rock	6	10	46
Narembeen	5	0	9	0	954	846	112.77%	20									
Corrigin	5	0	9	0	803	1137	70.62%	20									
Hyden/Karlgarin	4	0	10	0	823	1382	59.55%	16									
Burracoppin	2	0	12	0	559	1496	37.37%	8									

=== 2019 ladder ===
Eastern Districts	Wins	Byes	Losses	Draws	For	Against	%	Pts	Final	Team	G	B	Pts	Team	G	B	Pts
Nukarni	11	0	2	1	1671	904	184.85%	46	1st semi	Corrigin	17	11	113	Hyden/Karlgarin	9	13	67
Kulin/Kondinin	11	0	3	0	1653	964	171.47%	44	2nd semi	Nukarni	16	13	109	Kulin/Kondinin	7	13	55
Hyden/Karlgarin	10	0	3	1	1702	819	207.81%	42	Preliminary	Kulin/Kondinin	14	12	96	Corrigin	11	12	78
Corrigin	9	0	5	0	1375	868	158.41%	36	Grand	Nukarni	11	20	86	Kulin/Kondinin	12	7	79
Narembeen	8	0	6	0	1236	1063	116.27%	32									
Southern Cross	4	0	10	0	1098	1210	90.74%	16									
Burracoppin	2	0	12	0	860	1775	48.45%	8									
Bruce Rock	0	0	14	0	430	2422	17.75%	0									
