= Ravensthorpe & Districts Football Association =

The Ravensthorpe & Districts Football Association is an Australian rules football organisation based in the town of Ravensthorpe on the southern coast of Western Australia, formed in 1968.

The R&DFA has had only two member clubs since 2016 - Southerners from Hopetoun, and the Ravensthorpe Tigers - after the Lakes club went into recess.

== Clubs ==
=== Locations ===
Locations of the Ravensthorpe & District FL clubs

=== Current ===
Club	Colours	Nickname	Home Ground	Former League	Est.	Years in RDFA	RDFA premierships	
Club	Colours	Nickname	Home Ground	Former League	Est.	Years in RDFA	Total	Years
Ravensthorpe		Tigers	Ravensthorpe Oval, Ravensthorpe	EDFA	1962	1968–	26	1972, 1975, 1980, 1984, 1986, 1987, 1989, 1990, 1995, 1996, 1997, 2001, 2002, 2005, 2009, 2012, 2013, 2014, 2015, 2017, 2018, 2019, 2020, 2021, 2024, 2026
Southerners		Sharks	Hopetoun Oval, Hopetoun	–	1968	1968–	13	1969, 1970, 1977, 1980, 1979, 1992, 1994, 2007, 2008, 2016, 2022, 2023, 2025

=== Previous ===
Club	Colours	Nickname	Home Ground	Former League	Est.	Years in RDFA	RDFA premierships		Fate
Club	Colours	Nickname	Home Ground	Former League	Est.	Years in RDFA	Total	Years	Fate
Lakes		Vikings	Lake King Sports Ground, Lake King	–	1988	1988-2016	7	1998, 1999, 2000, 2003, 2006, 2010, 2011	Entered recess after 2016 season. Still field netball, hockey and junior football teams
Lakes Districts			Varley Oval, Varley	LGKDFA		1976-1987	0	-	Merged with Lake King to form Lakes in 1988
Lake King			Lake King Sports Ground, Lake King	–	1968	1968-1987	8	1968, 1973, 1974, 1976, 1981, 1982, 1983, 1985	Merged with Lakes Districts to form Lakes in 1988
Munglinup		Demons	Munglinup Oval, Munglinup	EDFA	1957	1968-1982, 1988-1997	4	1971, 1988, 1991, 1993	Moved to Esperance District FA in 1983, returned in 1988. Folded after 1997 season.
