= Deniliquin Football Association =

The Deniliquin Football Association (Deniliquin FA) was first established in 1900 to cater for Southern Riverina (New South Wales) Australian rules football clubs in and around Deniliquin.

== History ==
In 1901, the Deniliquin footballers, under the name of the Commonwealth Football Club won the premiership and received premiership medals from Mr. John Moore Chanter, MHR.

In 1903, Imperials FC won the Deniliquin Football Association premiership and P Hickey won the goalkicking award.

It appears that the Deniliquin FA went into recess at the conclusion of the 1904 season, when it was superseded by the Deniliquin Half Holiday Football Association in 1905, with this competition active up until 1913, when the Deniliquin FA was re-established in early 1914.

In 1919, the Deniliquin FA was reformed after a three-year break due to World War I, with the following three club's participating – East End, Federals and Railways.

In 1923, Ron Turner, from the Mathoura Football Club won the Derbyshire Trophy for the Most Consistent Player in the Deniliquin FA.

In 1926, Australian Wallaby International Rugby Union player, Tom Lawton – Senior played Australian rules football in Deniliquin, with the East End Football Club.

Bill MacDonald played for the Colts Football Club before making his debut the Melbourne Football Club in 1929.

In August 1930, at a meeting of the Deniliquin FA, it was decided that if larger attendees of the public were not forthcoming at local matches, the season would be abandoned, due to the effects of the Great Depression. There are no scanned copies of The Deniliquin Independent newspaper on the Trove Newspapers website from July to December, 1930 to find out who won the 1930 Deniliquin FA premiership.

Moonacullah won the 1932 Deniliquin FA premiership and were a very talented team from the Moonacullah Aboriginal Mission Station, situated on the Edwards River, 41 kilometres, west of Deniliquin. Moonacullah's first recorded match was against a combined Deniliquin FA team in 1914. For many years Moonacullah played many friendly one-off games against the Deniliquin FA and also against the Cummeragunga Aboriginal Mission football team, which was situated on the Murray River, at Barmah.

A combined Deniliquin FA use to play the Echuca FA in an annual football match for many years.

In 1933, the Deniliquin Football Club was formed and entered the Echuca Football League, which resulted in the demise of the Deniliquin FA, after 33 years.

== Clubs ==
=== Final ===
Club	Colours	Nickname	Home Ground	Former League	Est.	Years in DFA	DFA Senior Premierships		Fate
Club	Colours	Nickname	Home Ground	Former League	Est.	Years in DFA	Total	Years	Fate
Moonahcullah			Hardinge Street Oval, Deniliquin	–	1924	1924, 1932	1	1932	Recess between 1925-31. Folded after 1932 season
North Deniliquin			Hardinge Street Oval, Deniliquin	–	1899	1899-1901, 1932	2	1899, 1900	Recess between 1902-31. Merged with South Deniliquin to form Deniliquin in Echuca FA in 1933. Re-formed in Edward River FA in 1949
South Deniliquin	(with blue knickers)		Hardinge Street Oval, Deniliquin	–	1899	1899-1900, 1932	0	-	Recess between 1901-31. Merged with North Deniliquin to form Deniliquin in Echuca FA in 1933.

=== Former ===
Club	Colours	Nickname	Home Ground	Former League	Est.	Years in DFA	DFA Senior Premierships		Fate
Club	Colours	Nickname	Home Ground	Former League	Est.	Years in DFA	Total	Years	Fate
Citizens			Hardinge Street Oval, Deniliquin	–	1906	1906-1907	1	1906	Folded after 1907 season
Colts			Hardinge Street Oval, Deniliquin	–	1925	1925-1930	3	1925, 1926, 1927	Folded after 1930 season
Commonwealth			Hardinge Street Oval, Deniliquin	–	1901	1901-1902	2	1901, 1902	Folded after 1902 season
Deniliquin			Hardinge Street Oval, Deniliquin	–	1894	1894-1896	1	1895	Folded after 1896 season
East End	(1911-24, 1927-31)(1925-26)	Maroons	Hardinge Street Oval, Deniliquin	–	1911	1911, 1913, 1915-1929, 1931	2	1924, 1931	Recess in 1912, 1914 and 1930. Folded after 1931 season. Re-formed in Edward River FA in 1949
Federals			Hardinge Street Oval, Deniliquin	–	1903	1903, 1911, 1913, 1915, 1931	1	1915	Recess between 1904-10, 1912, 1914 and 1916-30. Folded after 1931 season
Imperials			Hardinge Street Oval, Deniliquin	–	1894	1894-1896, 1903-1905, 1908-1910, 1912	3	1896, 1909, 1910	Recess between 1897-1902, 1906-07 and 1911. Folded after 1912 season
Juniors			Hardinge Street Oval, Deniliquin	–	1899	1899-1900	0	-	Folded after 1900 season
Mathoura		Timbercutters	Mathoura Recreation Reserve, Mathoura	MFA	1902	1902, 1920-1927, 1931	4	1920, 1921, 1922, 1923	Unaffiliated after 1902. Formed Mathoura FA in 1928. Formed Echuca FA in 1932
Natives			Hardinge Street Oval, Deniliquin	–	1904	1904-1912	1	1905	Folded after 1912 season
Railways		Magpies	Hardinge Street Oval, Deniliquin	–	1911	1911, 1913, 1915, 1923-1924	1	1913	Recess in 1912, 1914 and between 1916-22. Folded after 1924 season
Rovers		Magpies	Hardinge Street Oval, Deniliquin	–	1903	1903-1910, 1912, 1928-1930	6	1903, 1904, 1907, 1908, 1912, 1928	Recess in 1911 and between 1913-27. Folded after 1930 season
Trades United			Hardinge Street Oval, Deniliquin	–	1894	1894-1896	1	1894	Folded after 1894
Walliston			Walliston Recreation Reserve, Walliston	MFA	1921	1929-1930	2	1929, 1930	Folded after 1930 season
West End			Hardinge Street Oval, Deniliquin	–	1920	1920-1922	0	-	Recess between 1922-48, re-formed in Edward River FA in 1949

The following clubs played in the Deniliquin Half Holiday Football Association.

- Citizens
- (Deniliquin) Rovers
- Imperials
- The Natives
- Number One (red & white) 1911 & 1912
- Number Two (red & blue) 1911 & 1912
- Number Three (black & white) 1911 & 1912

== Grand Finals / Premiers ==
Deniliquin Football Association (1894-1904)

  - 1894: Trades United d Deniliquin
  - 1995: Deniliquin
  - 1896: Imperials
  - 1897-1898: Recess
  - 1899: North Deniliquin
  - 1900: North Deniliquin
  - 1901: Commonwealth d North
  - 1902: Commonwealth d Mathoura
  - 1903: Imperials
  - 1904: Rovers

Deniliquin Half Holiday Football Association (1905-1913)

  - 1905: The Natives: 10.12 – 72 defeated Rovers: 3.5 – 23.
  - 1906: Citizens
  - 1907: Rovers
  - 1908: Rovers d Imperials
  - 1909: Imperials d Rovers
  - 1910: Imperials: 6.5 – 41 defeated Rovers: 3.6 – 24.
  - 1911: ?
  - 1912: No.3: 7.12 – 54 defeated No.2: 4.8 – 32.
  - 1913: Railways

Deniliquin Football Association (1914-1932)

  - 1914: Railways
  - 1915: Federals defeated Railways
  - 1916: DFA in recess due to World War I.
  - 1917: DFA in recess due to World War I.
  - 1918: DFA in recess due to World War I.
  - 1919: Federals: 5.7 – 37 defeated Railways: 2.8 – 20.
  - 1920: Mathoura: 6.3 – 39 defeated East End: 0.6 – 6.
  - 1921: Mathoura: 10.12 – 72 defeated West Deniliquin: 0.4 – 4.
  - 1922: Mathoura
  - 1923: Mathoura: 7.8 – 50 defeated Railways: 2.9 – 27.
  - 1924: East End
  - 1925: Colts: 13.16 – 94 defeated East End: 7.11 – 53.
  - 1926: Colts: 6.7 – 43 defeated East End: 6.3 – 39.
  - 1927: Colts: 6.12 – 48 defeated East End: 2.10 – 22.
  - 1928: Deniliquin Rovers: 14.14 – 98 defeated Colts: 10.10 – 70.
  - 1929: Walliston. No grand final played.
  - 1930: Walliston d Colts
  - 1931: East End: 3.4 – 22 defeated Mathoura: 2.3 – 15.
  - 1932: Moonacullah: 5.13 – 43 defeated South Deniliquin: 3.12 – 30.
