= Bob Vagg (athlete) =

Australian long-distance runner

Robert Andrew Vagg (born 2 February 1940) is an Australian former long-distance runner who competed in the 1964 Summer Olympics.
