= Bob Vagg (footballer) =

Australian rules footballer

Personal information
- Full name: Robert N. Vagg
- Born: 3 April 1941 (age 85)
- Original team: Echuca
- Height: 183 cm (6 ft 0 in)
- Weight: 80 kg (176 lb)

Playing career^{1}
Years	Club	Games (Goals)
1964–1965	Hawthorn	3 (0)
- ^{1} Playing statistics correct to the end of 1965.

Robert "Bob" Vagg (born 3 April 1941 in Colac, Victoria) is a former Australian rules footballer who played with Hawthorn in the Victorian Football League (VFL).

Hawthorn recruited Vagg on the back of his Michelsen Medal winning season for Echuca in 1963. He appeared in three of the first four rounds of the 1964 VFL season but from then on struggled with injuries. A defender, he returned to the Bendigo Football League once his time at Hawthorn came to an end and went on to play over 200 games for Echuca before retiring in the 1970s.
