= Seppings =

Seppings may refer to:

- Robert Seppings, an English naval architect
- Lake Seppings, a freshwater lake in Western Australia named after Robert Seppings
- Seppings, Western Australia, a suburb of the City of Albany, location of Lake Seppings
