= Kitja =

Kitja may be,

- Kitja people, Australia
  - Kitja language, Australia
- Kitja Boorn (spearwood)
