= Collingwood Heights, Western Australia =

Suburb of the City of Albany, Western Australia

Collingwood Heights Albany, Western Australia
- Coordinates: 34°59′31″S 117°55′19″E
- Population: 694 (SAL 2021)
- Postcode(s): 6330
- Area: 2.5 km^{2} (1.0 sq mi)
- Location: 5 km (3 mi) from Albany
- LGA(s): City of Albany
- State electorate(s): Albany
- Federal division(s): O'Connor
Suburbs around Collingwood Heights:
| Lange | | Bayonet Head |
| Yakamia | Collingwood Heights | Emu Point |
| Spencer Park | Seppings | Collingwood Park |

Collingwood Heights is a north-eastern suburb of Albany, Western Australia, between the Albany city centre and Emu Point within the local government area of the City of Albany.

It was gazetted in 1981, prior to which it was known as Collingwood.

== Geography ==
Collingwood Heights is bounded by the Yakamia Creek Diversion to the north, Martin and Ulster Roads to the west and Collingwood Road to the southeast. Most of the suburb's population of 684 persons are concentrated around a small residential estate at Breaksea Park.

The suburb was gazetted in 1981.

== Facilities ==
Collingwood Heights is a small residential suburb located within a wider open area in the creek's catchment area. A B&B and an information bay are located in the suburb.

Collingwood Heights contains a private school, Southlands Christian College, which was established in 1999 and teaches the ACE curriculum. The nearest state primary school is two suburbs away in Mount Clarence. High school students have the option of going to St Joseph's College, a private Catholic school in Spencer Park, or Albany Senior High School.

== Transport ==
Collingwood Heights is served by route 401 and selected route 201 services from Albany operated by Love's Bus Service.
