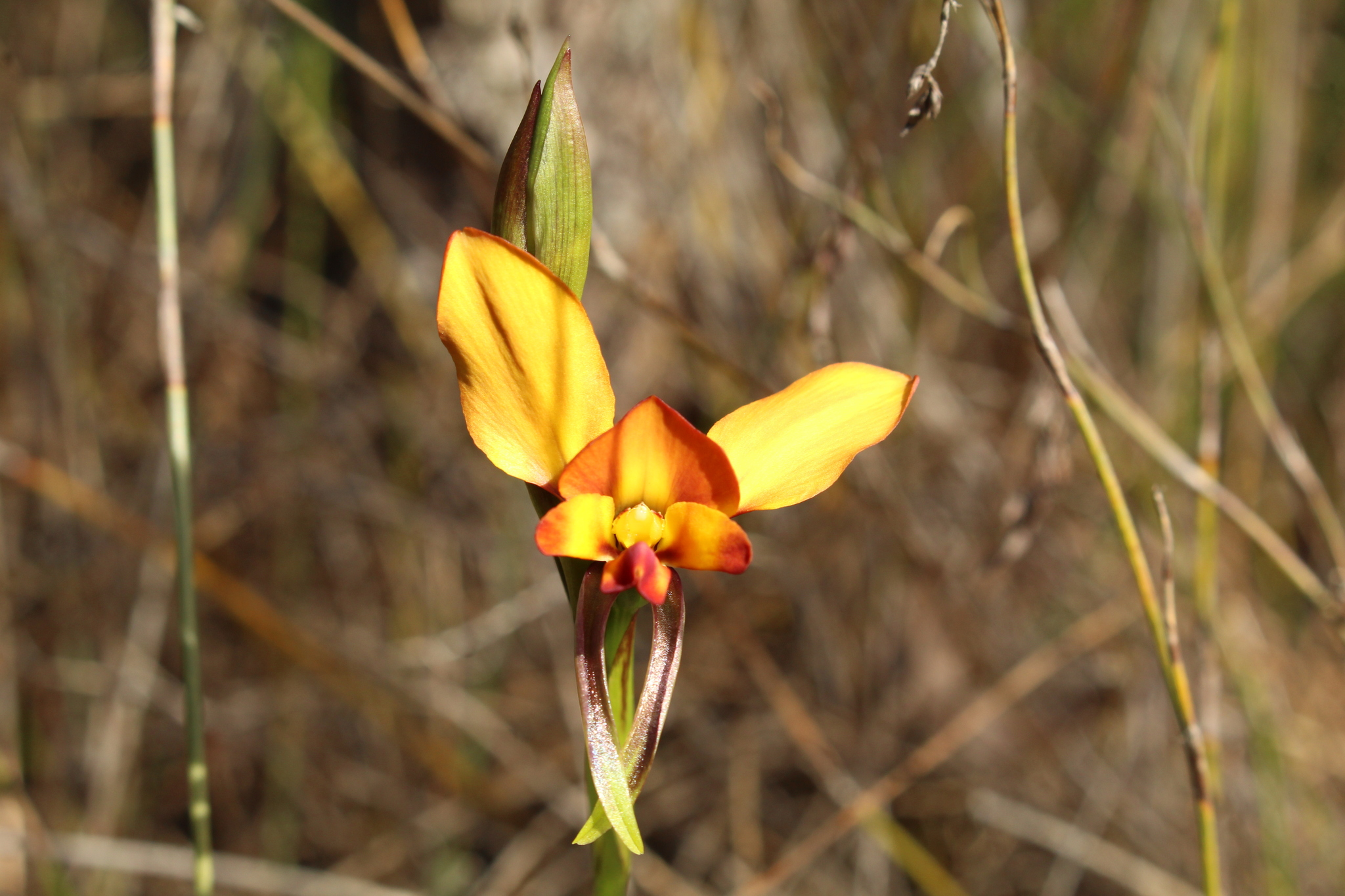
- Near Middleton Beach

Scientific classification
- Kingdom: Plantae
- Clade: Tracheophytes
- Clade: Angiosperms
- Clade: Monocots
- Order: Asparagales
- Family: Orchidaceae
- Subfamily: Orchidoideae
- Tribe: Diurideae
- Genus: Diuris
- Species: D. littoralis

Binomial name
- Diuris littoralis D.L.Jones & C.J.French

= Diuris littoralis =

Green Range donkey orchid

Species of orchid

Diuris littoralis, commonly known as Green Range donkey orchid, is a species of orchid that is endemic to the south-west of Western Australia. It has two or three linear leaves and up to six yellow, brown and mauve flowers from late July to early September.

== Description ==
Diuris littoralis is a tuberous, perennial herb with two or three linear leaves 80–200 mm (3.1–7.9 in) long and 3–8 mm (0.12–0.31 in) wide. Up to six yellow flowers with brown and mauve markings, 25–35 mm (0.98–1.38 in) long and 25–30 mm (0.98–1.18 in) wide are borne on a flowering stem 180–300 mm (7.1–11.8 in) tall. The dorsal sepal is egg-shaped, 8–11 mm (0.31–0.43 in) long and 8–13 mm (0.31–0.51 in) wide, the lateral sepals narrowly oblong, parallel or crossed, 12–19 mm (0.47–0.75 in) long and 2–3 mm (0.079–0.118 in) wide. The petals are more or less broadly elliptic, 12–14 mm (0.47–0.55 in) long and 9–11 mm (0.35–0.43 in) wide on a stalk 3–5 mm (0.12–0.20 in) long. The labellum is 7–9 mm (0.28–0.35 in) long with three lobes - the centre lobe wedge-shaped with down-curved edges, 6–8 mm (0.24–0.31 in) long and 4–7 mm (0.16–0.28 in) wide, the side lobes spread widely apart and oblong, 7–9 mm (0.28–0.35 in) long and 3–5 mm (0.12–0.20 in) wide. There is a single smooth, yellow callus ridge along the mid-line of the labellum. Flowering occurs from late July to early September.

== Taxonomy and naming ==
Diuris littoralis was first formally described in 2016 by David Jones and Christopher J. French in Australian Orchid Review, from a specimen collected by Jones near the hospital in Spencer Park in 1986. The specific epithet (littoralis) means "belonging to the sea shore", referring to the coastal or near-coastal habitat of this species.

== Distribution and habitat ==
Green Range donkey orchid grows in coastal and near-coastal shrublands and woodlands on well-drained laterite, in clay near streams and in shallow sand over limestone between Denmark and Esperance in the Avon Wheatbelt, Esperance Plains, Jarrah Forest and Mallee bioregions of south-western Western Australia.

== Conservation ==
Diuris littoralis is listed as "not threatened" by the Western Australian Government Department of Biodiversity, Conservation and Attractions.
