= List of WAFL grounds =

The West Australian Football League (WAFL) has utilised a number of different grounds since its formation in 1885. This list comprises grounds currently in use (that is, used in the 2011 season, grounds formerly in use and defunct grounds. Under the laws of Australian football, a ground must be grassed, have a minimum length of 135 metres (443 ft) and a minimum width of 110 metres (360 ft).

Most current WAFL grounds were originally constructed for the sole purpose of serving as a home ground for Australian rules football clubs, either by the clubs or local government authorities. Some grounds have also hosted other sports, including rugby league, rugby union, soccer and cricket. Two WAFL venues, the WACA Ground and Subiaco Oval, have also hosted matches in the Australian Football League (AFL).

The competition's grand final was previously held every year at Subiaco Oval (Domain Stadium), but is now played at the newly constructed Perth Stadium (Optus Stadium) in Burswood, it is the largest stadium in Western Australia, with a maximum capacity of 60,000 people. The WAFL's attendance record was set at Subiaco Oval, with 52,781 people attending the 1979 Grand Final.

== Grounds ==
=== Major grounds ===
Ground name (sponsored name)	Location	Capacity	Record capacity (year)	Matches	Tenant(s) former tenants	First used	Notes
Anniversary Park	Rockingham	2500	2241 (2009)	5	Peel Thunder	?	Hosted five matches between Peel and South Fremantle.
Arena Joondalup (Pentanet Stadium)	Joondalup	16 000	15 082 (1994)	336	West Perth	1994	The complex around it is still sponsored by HBF.
Bassendean Oval (Steel Blue Oval)	Bassendean	22 000	22 350 (1980)	757	Swan Districts	1934	
Claremont Oval (Revo Fitness Stadium)	Claremont	10 000	18 268 (1983)	796	Claremont	1927	
Claremont Showground	Claremont	10 000	?	30	Claremont	1907	Neutral venue 1907–08, 1922. Claremont home ground 1926–27; 2014–2015.
East Fremantle Oval (New Choice Homes Park)	East Fremantle	20 000	21 317 (1979)	602	East Fremantle	1953	
Fremantle Oval (Fremantle Community Bank Oval)	Fremantle	17 500	23 109 (1979)	1464	South Fremantle; East Fremantle (1898–1952); North Fremantle (1912–15)	1898	
Fremantle Park	Fremantle	?	?	?	Fremantle/Unions	1890	
Geraldton Recreation Ground	Beachlands	5000	7970 (1985)	7	East Fremantle	1985	
Gosnells Recreation Ground	Gosnells	2000	1597 (1996)	1	Perth	1996	
Lathlain Park (Mineral Resources Park)	Lathlain	20 000	19 541 (1967)	505	Perth	1928	
Leederville Oval	Leederville	18 000	24 567 (1978)	916	East Perth; Subiaco; West Perth (1915–93)	1915	Shared between East Perth and Subiaco since 1999.
North Fremantle Oval currently known as Gilbert Fraser Reserve	North Fremantle	05000	4000	131	North Fremantle; East Fremantle (1901–12); South Fremantle (1901–12)	1901	
Perth Stadium (Optus Stadium)	Burswood	60 000	29 879 (2021)	7	neutral	2018	Hosted the WAFL Grand Final in 2018, 2019, 2021, 2023, 2024
Perth Oval (HBF Park)	Perth	20 500	26 760 (1969)	834	East Perth	1997	Hosted six WAFL Grand Finals between 1912 and 1935.
Sir Richard Moore Oval	Kalgoorlie	6000	7139 (1986)	5	Subiaco	1986	
Rushton Park (Kelmscott)	Kelmscott	2000	3601 (1989)	3	Perth	1989	
Rushton Park (Mandurah) (lane Group Stadium)	Mandurah	10 000	7147 (1986)	132	Peel Thunder	1986	
Shenton Park	Shenton Park	?	?	8	Subiaco	1900	
Subiaco Oval	Subiaco	43 500	52 781 (1979)	1411	neutral Subiaco (1908-2004); Claremont (1945–46)	1908	Used for the WAFL Grand Final until 2018. Hosted occasional Subiaco home games, the last of which was in 2016.
Wanneroo Showgrounds	Wanneroo	6000	5007 (1989)	3	East Perth; West Perth	1989	
WACA Ground	East Perth	24 500	11 835 (1994)	681	Perth; West Perth	1898	Hosted eight WAFL Grand Finals between 1906 and 1926.

=== Non-metropolitan grounds ===
Ground name (sponsored name)	Location	Capacity	Record capacity (year)	Matches	First used	Notes
Bruce Rock Sporting Complex	Bruce Rock	2000	1900 (2001)	1	2001	
Capricorn Oval	Newman	2000	3000 (2008)	2	2002	
Collie Recreation Ground	Collie	2000	1800 (2001)	1	2001	
Collingwood Park	Albany	5000	4638; 1989	5	1989	
Corrigin Oval	Corrigin	2000	1900 (2009)	1	2009	
Cunderdin Oval	Cunderdin	2000	1678 (2004)	1	2004	
Dampier Sports Club	Dampier	6000	6040 (1985)	1	1985	
Esperance Oval	Esperance	2500	2394 (2005)	3	2000	
Frost Park	Mount Barker	2500	2556 (1987)	1	1987	
Greater Sports Ground	Katanning	2000	1872 (2004)	1	2004	
Hands Oval	Bunbury	5000	6573 (1984)	5	1984	
Jubilee Park	Northam	2500	2500 (1998)	1	1998	
Jurien Oval	Jurien Bay	1500	1250 (2002)	1	2002	
Kambalda Oval	Kambalda West	2000	1514 (2006)	1	2006	
Manjimup Recreation Ground	Manjimup	2000	1965 (2006)	1	2006	
McLean Oval	Denmark	2500	2500 (2004)	1	2004	
Millars Well Oval currently known as Kevin Richards Memorial Oval	Karratha	5000	5000 (2000)	1	2000	
Moora Reserve	Moora	?	?	1	1999	
Newdegate Showgrounds	Newdegate	1500	1500(2002)	1	2002	
Northampton Community Oval	Northampton	5000	3000 (2022)	1	2022	
Ord River Sports Club	Kununurra	4000	3000(2000)	1	2000	
Peter Haynes Oval	Broome	5000	3950 (2006)	1	2006	
Pingelly Oval	Pingelly	?	1842 (2021)	1	2021	
Sir Stewart Bovell Park	Busselton	2000)	1473 (2003)	1	2003	
Talanjee Oval	Exmouth	?	?	1	1999	
Toodyay Showgrounds	Toodyay	2000	1200 (2000)	1	2000	
Town Oval	Carnarvon	3000	2650 (2007)	1	2007	
VC Mitchell Park	Donnybrook	2000	1648 (2005)	1	2005	
Waldeck Street Oval	Dongara	1500	1850 (2007)	1	2007	
Wickepin Oval	Wickepin	1500	1300 (2002)	1	2002	

=== Country venues ===
Various country towns in Western Australia have hosted WAFL games as a part of the competition's "Country Week", or for similar promotions. Towns which have at least one regular season WAFL game are listed below. The exact name of the ground can often not be determined, but is listed where possible.

Location	Ground name	Matches	Home team(s)	Notes
Albany	Collingwood Park other venues unknown	4	Claremont	Claremont has hosted four games in Albany, most recent in 2009 at Collingwood Park.
Broome	N/A	1	Swan Districts	Hosted one match between Claremont and Swan Districts.
Bruce Rock	N/A	1	N/A	Hosted one match between Perth and West Perth in 2001.
Bunbury	Hands Oval other venues unknown	5	East Perth (2); Swan Districts (3)	
Busselton	N/A	1	N/A	Hosted one match between East Perth and Swan Districts.
Carnarvon	N/A	1	N/A	Hosted one match between South Fremantle and West Perth.
Collie	N/A	1	N/A	Hosted one match between Claremont and Swan Districts.
Corrigin	N/A	1	N/A	Hosted one match between Peel and West Perth.
Cunderdin	N/A	1	N/A	Hosted one match between Perth and Subiaco.
Dampier	N/A	3	East Perth	
Denmark	N/A	1	N/A	Hosted one match between Claremont and South Fremantle.
Dongara	N/A	1	N/A	Hosted one match between East Fremantle and Perth.
Donnybrook	N/A	1	N/A	Hosted one match between East Perth and Peel.
Esperance	N/A	2	Peel Thunder	
Exmouth	N/A	1	N/A	Hosted one match between East Perth and Subiaco.
Geraldton	N/A possibly at Geraldton Recreation Ground	6	East Fremantle	
Jurien Bay	N/A	1	N/A	Hosted one match between Perth and Subiaco.
Kalgoorlie	At least 1 at Sir Richard Moore Oval	6	Subiaco	Most Recently hosted a game in 2022
Kambalda	N/A	1	Subiaco	Hosted one match between Perth and Subiaco in 2006.
Katanning	N/A	1	N/A	Hosted one match between Claremont and East Perth in 2000.
Mukinbudin	Mukinbudin Football Oval	1	N/A	Hosted one match between West Perth and Perth in 2006.
Northampton	Northampton Community Oval	1	East Fremantle	Hosted the Seroja Cup between East Fremantle and East Perth, Round 3, 2022.
Pingelly	Pingelly Oval	1	South Fremantle	Hosted one match between South Fremantle and Peel in 2021.

== See also ==
- List of Australian Football League grounds
