= Ryan Brabazon =

Australian rules footballer

Personal information
- Full name: Ryan Gregory Brabazon
- Born: 26 December 1987 (age 38); Kalgoorlie Western Australia
- Original team: North Albany (GSFL)
- Debut: 3 August 2008, Sydney Swans vs. Western Bulldogs, at Manuka Oval
- Height: 184 cm (6 ft 0 in)
- Weight: 81 kg (179 lb)

Playing career^{1}
Years	Club	Games (Goals)
2006–2010	Sydney Swans	3 (1)
- ^{1} Playing statistics correct to the end of 2009.

Ryan Gregory Brabazon (born 26 December 1986) is a former Australian rules footballer who played for the Sydney Swans in the Australian Football League.

After winning the Jack Clarke Medal for fairest and best in the WAFL Colts competition he was recruited as the number 59 draft pick in the 2005 AFL draft from Claremont. He made his debut for the Sydney Swans in round 18, 2008 against the Western Bulldogs.

He was delisted from the Sydney Swans at the end of the 2009 AFL season due to lack of opportunities.

Brabazon returned to Claremont in 2010 and played a vital role in the midfield as the team went on to lose the grand final by 1 point to Swan Districts. In 2011 Brabazon and Claremont went one better and claimed the WAFL premiership. He also played State football for Western Australia and was among their best players. He then went on to sign to play in the NEAFL competition for 2012 firstly with Canberra-based Eastlake Demons before becoming assistant playing coach for the Sydney University. He also represented NSW/ACT NEAFL teams.
