= North Albany Football Club =

Coordinates: 35°0′4.25″S 117°55′7.36″E

North Albany - Football Club
- Nickname: Kangas (Kangaroos)
- Sport: Australian rules football
- Founded: 1897
- First season: 1897
- League: Great Southern Football League
- Home ground: Collingwood Park, Albany
- President: Brodie Sumich
- Head coach: Brad Bootsma
- Captain: Nicholas Barrow

Strip
- Red with White V

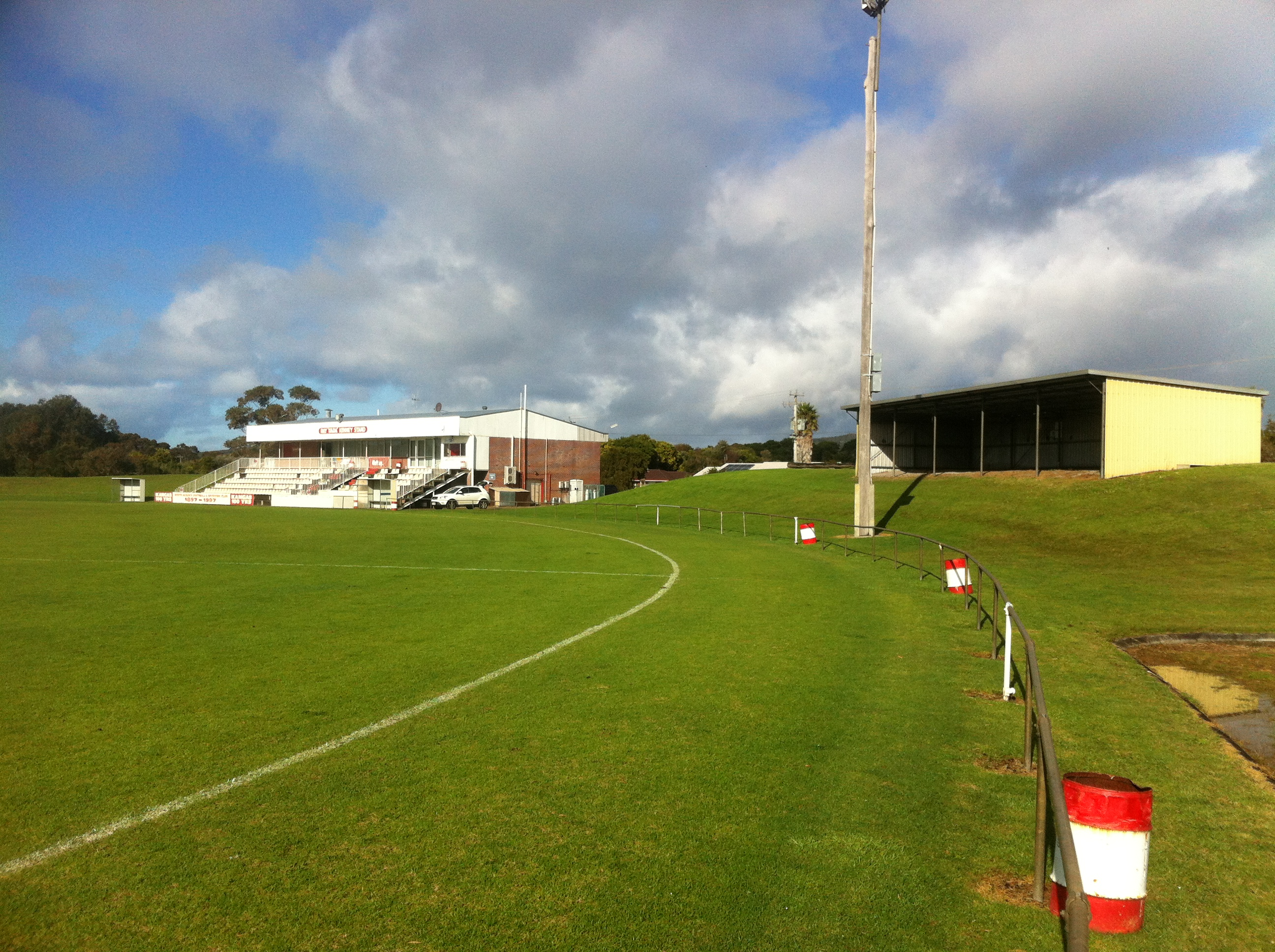
Ray Kenney Stand & shed, Collingwood Park

The North Albany Football and Sporting Club, more often referred to as North Albany, is an Australian rules football club located in Albany, Western Australia. Nicknamed the Kangas, the club play in the Great Southern Football League, with home games being hosted at Collingwood Park. Since being formed in 1897, netball and association football teams have played under banners of North Albany or Kangas.

== History ==
On 13 May 1897 football players from the North Ward formed a club called the North Albany Football Club. Wearing the colours of red and blue, the side played their inaugural matches at the Parade Street Oval. In 1908, North Albany competed in Albany's first formal football competition. North Albany entered the history books after claiming the first Premiership. It was in this season that the club altered their colours, with the team wearing red and white hooped guernseys.

In the late 1930s, the North Albany Football Club enjoyed a period of success. From 1936 until 1939, the club won continual Premiership flags. The club competed in their fifth successive Grand Final in 1939, only to lose the encounter.

Reformation after WWII the club altered their identity. This change came in the form of the club name, with Towns FC being adopted as the new moniker. This title would be dropped in 1956, with North Albany resuming as the club's official name.

Football in the Albany region had a massive overhaul in 1958 with the formation of The Southern Districts National Football League. Nineteen years later, in 1977, the North Albany Football Club move into a new home at Collingwood Park. The following season, the 'Fighting Kangaroo' became the club mascot. The aesthetic reconfiguration of the Kangas was followed with success. Another period of sustained dominance started with North Albany's 1979 Southern Districts National Football League Grand Final. Despite losing the 1979 finale, the club would go on to compete in five straight Grand Finals, winning the 1980, 1982, and 1983 editions.

In 1991 the league had an overhaul. The new titled Great Southern Football League included teams from neighbouring townships. Clubs in the GSFL represented Katanning, Mount Barker, Tambellup and Denmark.

Alan Barnett, who had played for the club in 1972 and 1973 when injury prevented him from playing on, served as Club President from 1998 to 2007, when he was awarded life membership.

After a period of dominance from cross-town rivals Royals, 2005 saw a resurgence for the Kangas. The club won four back-to-back Flags, ending a 22-year Premiership drought.

Russell Hare was President of the Club in 2007.

== Records and achievements ==
=== Football Premierships ===
League: 29:

- 2018
- 2017
- 2016
- 2015
- 2014
- 2008
- 2007
- 2006
- 2005
- 1983
- 1982
- 1980
- 1969
- 1966
- 1954
- 1952
- 1951
- 1948
- 1946
- 1939
- 1938
- 1937
- 1936
- 1930
- 1929
- 1925
- 1913
- 1910
- 1909

Reserves: 19:

- 2016
- 2015
- 2014
- 2010
- 2008
- 2007
- 2006
- 2005
- 1997
- 1988
- 1985
- 1982
- 1981
- 1980
- 1979
- 1958
- 1938
- 1937
- 1931

Colts: 26:

- 2015
- 2014
- 2012
- 2011
- 2010
- 2009
- 2008
- 2006
- 2003
- 2002
- 2001
- 2000
- 1999
- 1998
- 1996
- 1990
- 1989
- 1988
- 1987
- 1986
- 1983
- 1981
- 1980
- 1979
- 1969
- 1925

Under 16's: 1:

- 2011

=== Football Fairest & Best ===
League

2020	Talon Delacey
2019	Nathan Crudeli
2018	Matt Orzel
2017	Jack McPhee
2016	Matt Smith
2015	Matt Orzel
2014	Declan Mountford
2013	Luke Cameron
2012	Brent Welshman
2011	Mitch Tuffley
2010	Kris Ericsson
2009	Graham Ross
2008	Graham Ross,
2007	Graham Ross,
2006	Brett Hall,
2005	Scott McKenzie,
2004	Jono Woods,
2003	Brett Hall/ Jono Woods,
2002	Brett Hall,
2001	Brett Hall,
2000	Mat Bateman
1999	Boydan Coyne,
1998	Mat Bateman,
1997	Murray Gomm,
1996	Simon Deegan,
1995	Mick Mustey,
1994	Nathan Ashton,
1993	Jono Woods,
1992	Brad Hitchcock,
1991	Gerard Cameron,
1990	Jono Woods
1989	Ray Mountfield,
1988	Gerard Cameron,
1987	Rob Sutton,
1986	Andrew Partington,
1985	Rob Sutton,
1984	Keith Wynne,
1983	Brian Stamp,
1982	Keith Wynne,
1981	Keith Wynne,
1980	Kim Allsop
1979	Graeme Evans,
1978	Ollie Galante,
1977	Les Holt,
1976	Clive Bonney,
1975	Rod Gillies,
1974	Peter Stephen,
1973	Peter Stephen,
1972	Rod Gillies,
1971	Graham Wellington,
1970	Gary Adams
1969	Gary Adams,
1968	Peter Stephen,
1967	Peter Stephen,
1966	Peter Stephen,
1965	Len Edwards,
1964	Edward Thompson,
1963	Edward Thompson,
1962	Edward Thompson

=== Kleemann Medalists ===
2010	Kris Ericsson
2009	Graham Ross
2006	Brett Hall
2003	Brett Hall & Jono Woods
1995	Jono Woods
1986	Rob Sutton
1985	Rob Sutton
1984	Gerard Cameron
1980	Rob Sutton
1979	Peter Walsh
1967	Peter Stephen
1965	Ted Thompson
1964	Ted Thompson
1961	Ted Thompson
1960	Barry Loo

=== League Leading Goalkicker ===
2005	Doug Roberts (66)
1994	Troy Cox (71)
1980	Chris Elliot

=== (Reserves Fairest & Best) ===
Charlie Punch Medal

2016	Brodie Sumich & Jyrin Woods
2013	Grant Freeborough
2012	Reg Mcwhirter
2010	Adam Ditchburn & Jordan Willox
2009	Kael Sumich
2008	Mark Chambers
2006	Mark Chambers

=== Reserves Leading Goalkicker ===
2009	Boyden Coyne (27)

=== Rod Gillies Medal (Colts Fairest & Best) ===
2006	Jayden Woods
2004	Warwick Durack

=== AFL players ===
- 2016: Darcy Cameron was drafted to the Sydney Swans
- 2015: Declan Mountford was drafted to North Melbourne
- 2014: Mitch McGovern was drafted to Adelaide
- 2012: Marley Williams was drafted to Collingwood
- 2012: Josh Bootsma was drafted to Carlton
- 2010: Jeremy McGovern was drafted by the West Coast Eagles in the 2011 rookie draft.

Former AFL players started their football careers playing for the Kangas.

- Tarkyn Lockyer (Collingwood)
- Ryan Brabazon (Sydney)

Former AFL players have all played football in the red and white.

- Allen Daniels (Footscray & WA),
- Brad Wira (Footscray, Fremantle & WA),
- Brad Bootsma (Fremantle & WA) and
- Bill Shenfield (Fitzroy)

=== WAFL players ===
Some significant WAFL players that have played at the North Albany Football Club include -

- Ron Boucher (Swan Districts & WA),
- Peter Stephen (East Fremantle & WA),
- Stuart Hillier (West Perth & WA),
- Ray Nott (Claremont & WA),
- Doug Roberts (Claremont) and
- Matt Orzel (Claremont).

=== Other notable players ===
One time Kangas player and footballing nomad Trevor Sutton played in WA, SA, Qld, NSW, Victoria and North Territory, representing both Queensland and NSW at state level. In 1982, playing for Deniliquin in the Murray Football League (NSW) Sutton kicked 249 goals, an Australian record.

Gordon Collis ex-Carlton player and Brownlow medalist coached the North Albany Football Club for two years, winning a Premiership in 1969.

== AFL pre-season games ==
In 2003 the West Coast Eagles held a pre-season Community Camp in Albany, using Collingwood Park for training and practise games during their stay.

In 2008 Collingwood Park hosted a pre-season AFL game between West Coast and Collingwood, drawing a big crowd.

== Other sports and related clubs ==
The Collingwood Park Cricket Club, which calls Collingwood Park home, is a hugely successful club in the region winning many A Grade and B Grade premierships. In recent years the Collingwood Park CC A Grade has won titles in -

- 2007-08,
- 2006–07,
- 2005-06
- 2003-04

The newly formed North Albany Bears Soccer Club, made up of predominately NAFC players, won the Albany Soccer Association Trophy in its first year of competition.
