= Mira Mar, Western Australia =

Suburb of the City of Albany, Western Australia

Mira Mar
- Suburb
- Interactive map of Mira Mar
- Coordinates: 35°01′01″S 117°54′00″E
- Country: Australia
- State: Western Australia
- City: Albany
- LGA: City of Albany
- Location: 2 km (1.2 mi) from Albany

Government
  - State electorate: Albany
  - Federal division: O'Connor

Area
  - Total: 1.5 km^{2} (0.58 sq mi)
- Elevation: 36 m (118 ft)

Population
  - Total: 1,890 (SAL 2021)
- Postcode: 6330
Suburbs around Mira Mar
Spencer Park	Spencer Park	Seppings
Centennial Park	Mira Mar	Seppings
Mount Clarence	Mount Clarence	Middleton Beach

Mira Mar is a northeastern suburb of the City of Albany in the Great Southern region of Western Australia.

Mira Mar was gazetted as a suburb in 1979.

== Geography ==
Mira Mar is bounded by North and Collingwood Roads to the north, Drew Street to the east, Symers Street to the west and Middleton Road to the south. The suburb has a population of 1,682 persons, up from 1,539 at the 2006 election. Strawberry Hill (62 m) and Craggy Bluff dominate the local landscape.

== Facilities ==
Mira Mar contains the Old Farm at Strawberry Hill, which was first a 9.7-hectare (24-acre) vegetable farm on Plantagenet Location 44 for the military settlement of King George Sound, and then served as the residence of Albany's first Government Resident, Sir Richard Spencer RN, from 1832 until 1839. Spencer's grave is located on the site. Also in Mira Mar is the simple Victorian Georgian house built in 1872 by Matthew Cull, who was the long-time verger at St John's Church in Albany. Cull Park, in the suburb's northwest on Campbell Road, is 1.1 hectares (3 acres) in size and contains a small bridged pond and play equipment.
