= Bill Shenfield =

Australian rules footballer, born 1910

Personal information
- Full name: William Frederick Gerald Shenfield
- Born: 25 April 1909; Leederville, Western Australia
- Died: 13 October 1978 (aged 69); Albany, Western Australia
- Original team: South Fremantle / North Albany
- Height: 180 cm (5 ft 11 in)
- Weight: 85 kg (187 lb)

Playing career^{1}
Years	Club	Games (Goals)
1933	South Fremantle	18 (26)
1934–35	Fitzroy	25 (16)
1936–38	Coburg (VFA)	
- ^{1} Playing statistics correct to the end of 1938.

William Frederick Gerald Shenfield (25 April 1909 – 13 October 1978) was an Australian rules footballer who played with North Albany, South Fremantle in the West Australian Football League (WAFL), Fitzroy in the Victorian Football League (VFL) and Coburg in the Victorian Football Association (VFA).

Shenfield later served in the Australian Army during World War II.
