= Tarkyn Lockyer =

Australian rules footballer

Personal information
- Born: 30 October 1979 (age 47); Western Australia
- Original team: North Albany / East Fremantle
- Debut: Round 8, 15 May 1999, Collingwood vs. Fremantle, at Melbourne Cricket Ground

Playing career^{1}
Years	Club	Games (Goals)
1999–2010	Collingwood	227 (149)
- ^{1} Playing statistics correct to the end of 2010.

Career highlights
- 2nd Collingwood best and fairest 2000; 3rd Collingwood best and fairest 2001, 2007; 2009 Jason McCartney Medal

Tarkyn Lockyer (born 30 October 1979) is a former professional Australian rules football player who played for the Collingwood Football Club in the Australian Football League (AFL). Upon his retirement at the end of the 2010 season, he served as the head coach of the Collingwood VFL Football Club. He then served as the midfield development coach at Collingwood. As of 2021, he served as the AFL national talent head coach as well as being a member of the 2021 Women's Under-19 All-Australian team selection committee.

== Early life ==
Born in Albany, Western Australia, Lockyer attended Albany Senior High School and played for local club North Albany Football Club as a teenager before leaving to go to Perth to further his football career. Lockyer played colts and reserves level football with East Fremantle in the WAFL and was picked up by Collingwood as a third-round pick (Pick #39) of the 1997 AFL Rookie draft.

== AFL playing career ==
Collingwood rookie listed Lockyer in 1998 and he made his debut in a Magpies win against Fremantle early in 1999.

In 2000, Lockyer was the runner-up in the Copeland Trophy to Nathan Buckley. He averaged 17 disposals in 21 games. He played even better in 2001, missing two games, but having over 370 disposals at over 18 disposals per game, and also kicked 19 goals for the year off the half-back line. In 2002 he was appointed vice-captain. He played all 25 games for the season, including the Grand Final and had just under 450 disposals for the year.

The Magpies made the Grand Final again in 2003, but Lockyer missed most of the season, when he suffered an Anterior Cruciate Ligament injury in Round 3 and had to be stretchered off the ground. The injury required knee reconstruction surgery which ended his season. In the 2005 season he had 430 disposals in 22 matches, playing in every game.

He played every game in 2006.

== 2007 ==
Lockyer began 2007 with a goal against the North Melbourne Kangaroos. Two weeks later, he had 32 possessions in a game against the Richmond Tigers.

The opposition coach, Chris Connolly, claimed Lockyer would be the first player selected if State of Origin football was to be played this year.

== 2009 ==
Lockyer played his 200th AFL game in his home state against the West Coast Eagles at Subiaco Oval during Round 9 of the 2009 season. Collingwood won the game by 22 points, with Lockyer having 25 possessions and kicking 2 goals.

== 2010 ==
In and out of the side for the 2010 season, including being named as an emergency for both the Grand Final and replay, he played 11 games before retiring at the end of the season. He was named as the Coach of the VFL Side for the 2011 season.
