= Emu Point, Western Australia =

Suburb of the City of Albany, Western Australia

Emu Point
- Suburb
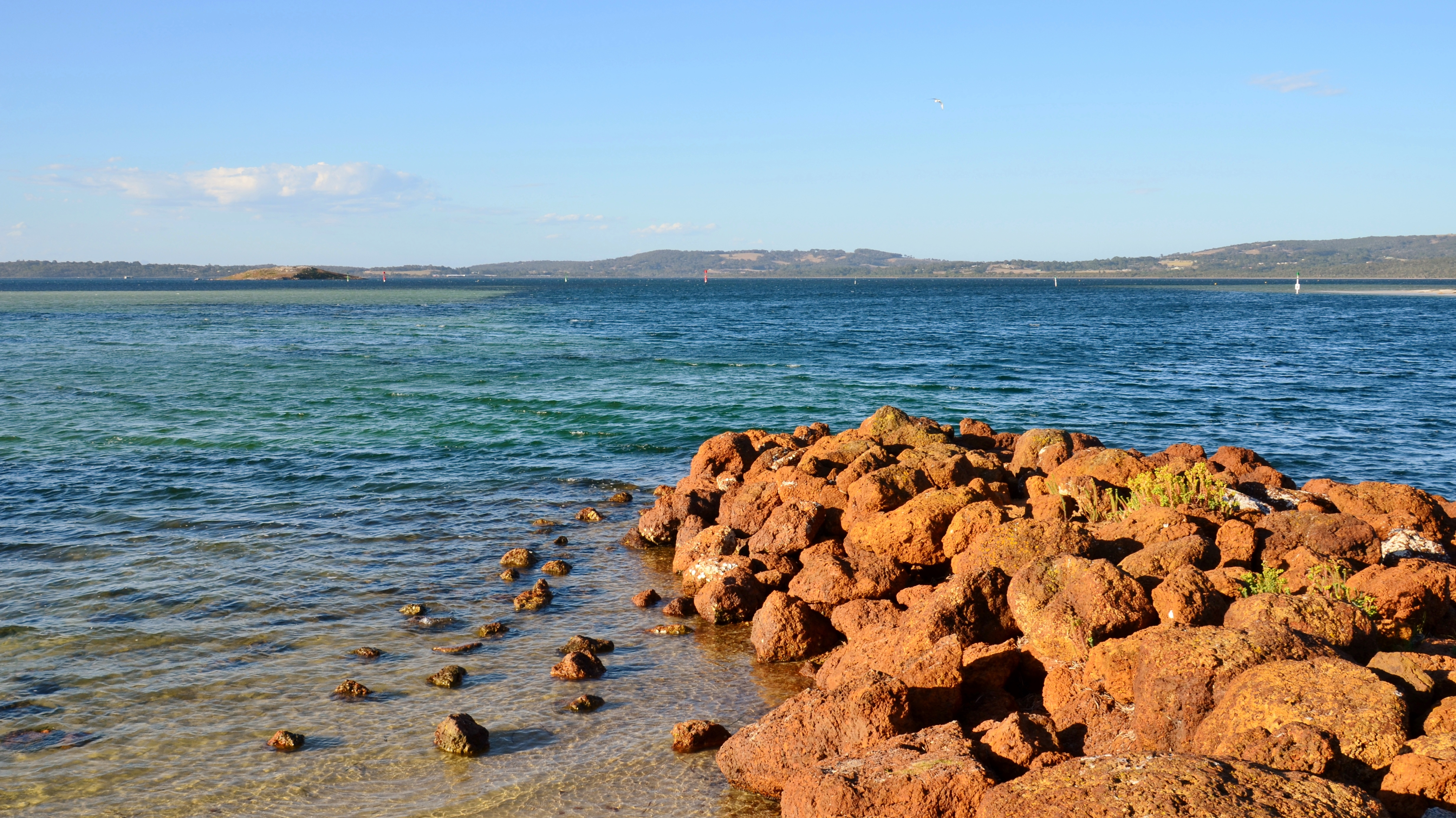
- Entrance to Oyster Harbour at Emu Point

- Interactive map of Emu Point
- Coordinates: 34°59′52″S 117°50′35″E
- Country: Australia
- State: Western Australia
- City: Albany
- LGA: City of Albany
- Location: 8 km (5.0 mi) from Albany

Government
  - State electorate: Albany
  - Federal division: O'Connor

Area
  - Total: 1.9 km^{2} (0.73 sq mi)

Population
  - Total: 285 (SAL 2021)
- Postcode: 6330
Suburbs around Emu Point
Collingwood Heights	Collingwood Heights	Oyster Harbour
Collingwood Heights	Emu Point	King George Sound
Collingwood Park	King George Sound	King George Sound

Emu Point is a north-eastern suburb of the City of Albany in the Great Southern region of Western Australia. It is located north-east of Albany's central business district.

As of the 2021 census, it had a median age of 71.

== History ==
It was the location of a spring associated with the visit of George Vancouver in the 1790s.

Emu Point was named by a survey ship in 1815.

In the early twentieth century it became a popular camping location, and has since continued as one with Big4 Emu Beach being established in 2014.

It was gazetted as a suburb in 1979.

== Geography ==
Emu Point is a promontory that juts into the water at the channel that connects Oyster Harbour to its north with King George Sound. These two bodies of water respectively form the suburb's north-east and south-east boundaries. Its northern boundary is Yakamia Creek and in the west by Lower King Road.

Emu Beach is the largest stretch of beach in Emu Point at 2.9 kilometres (1.8 mi) long along King George Sound. The beach has been rated as one of Australia's cleanest beaches.

The northern part of the suburb is the Boronia Reserve.
