= Collingwood Park, Western Australia =

Suburb of the City of Albany, Western Australia

Collingwood Park
- Suburb
- Coordinates: 35°00′14″S 117°55′26″E
- Country: Australia
- State: Western Australia
- City: Albany
- LGA(s): City of Albany
- Location: 5 km (3.1 mi) from Albany

Government
  - State electorate(s): Albany
  - Federal division(s): O'Connor

Area
  - Total: 2.2 km^{2} (0.85 sq mi)

Population
  - Total(s): 205 (SAL 2021)
- Postcode: 6330
Suburbs around Collingwood Park
Collingwood Heights	Collingwood Heights	Emu Point
Spencer Park	Collingwood Park	Emu Point
Seppings	Middleton Beach	Middleton Bay

Collingwood Park is a north-eastern suburb of Albany, Western Australia, just west of the Emu Point holiday resort along King George Sound on the west bank of Oyster Harbour. Its local government area is the City of Albany.

It was gazetted in 1979.

== Geography ==
Collingwood Park is bounded by Collingwood Road to the northwest and Middleton Bay to the southeast, lying between Emu Point and Seppings. Most of the suburb consists of natural bushland, with a couple of small residential pockets.

== Facilities ==
Collingwood Park is home to the Albany Golf Course, an 18-hole links course first developed in 1898, with a new clubhouse that was built in 2000. One source claims that Australian golfer Craig Parry regards the course as his favourite in Australia.

Only a few scattered residential pockets exist in Collingwood Park. A sporting club on Troode Street and a coastal B&B are also located in the suburb.

Collingwood Park also hosts Albany's largest sporting facility, Collingwood Park. The ground is home to North Albany Football and Sporting Club, Albany Football Club and Collingwood Park Cricket Club and has hosted several large events such as Crusty Demons's West Coast Carnage Tour and in 2008 hosted an AFL NAB Challenge Cup match between West Coast Eagles and Collingwood.
