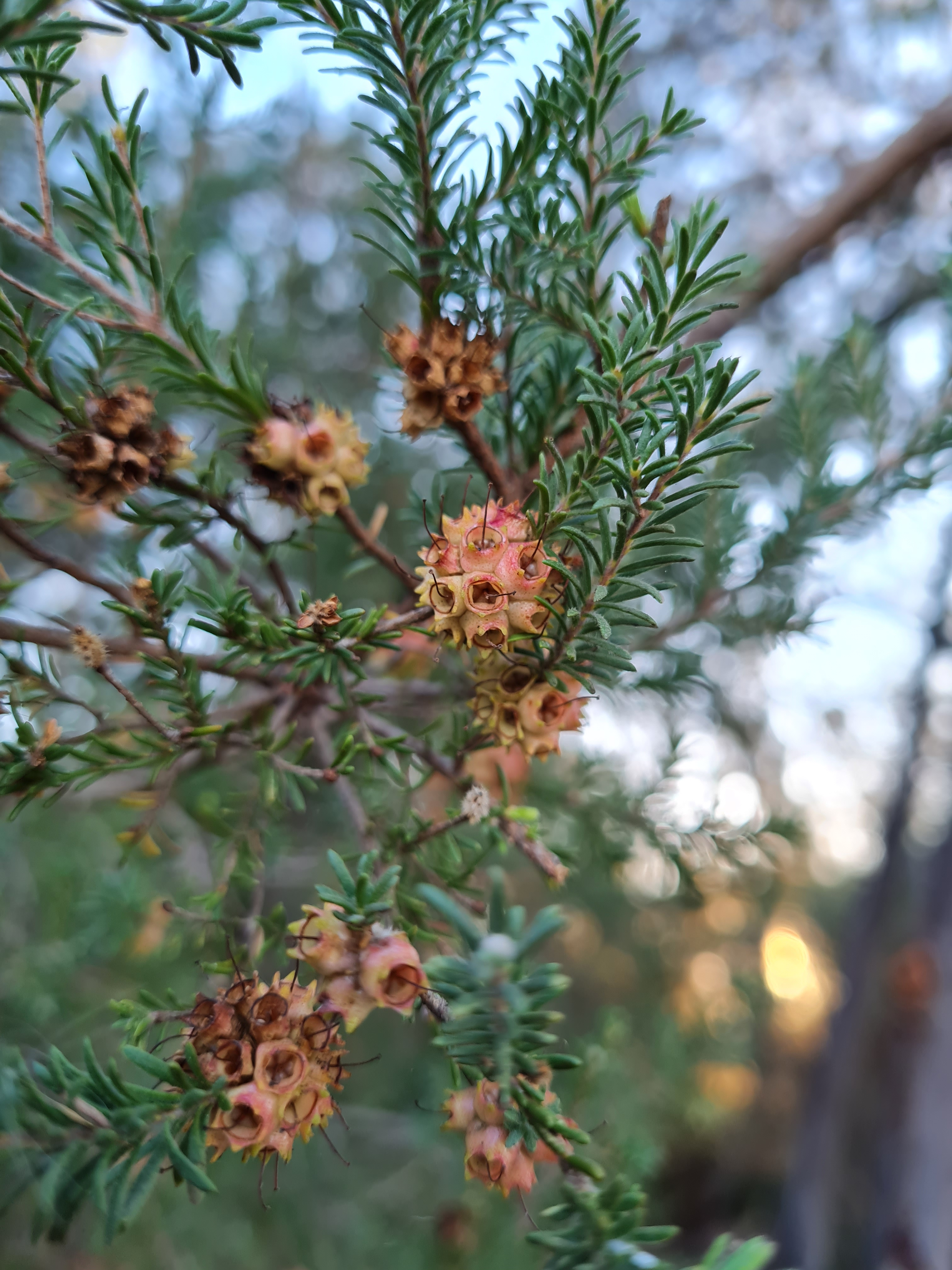

Scientific classification
- Kingdom: Plantae
- Clade: Embryophytes
- Clade: Tracheophytes
- Clade: Spermatophytes
- Clade: Angiosperms
- Clade: Eudicots
- Clade: Rosids
- Order: Myrtales
- Family: Myrtaceae
- Genus: Kunzea
- Species: K. glabrescens

Binomial name
- Kunzea glabrescens Toelken

= Kunzea glabrescens =

Spearwood

Species of flowering plant

Kunzea glabrescens, commonly known as spearwood, is a flowering plant in the myrtle family, Myrtaceae and is endemic to the south-west of Western Australia. It is a large shrub with leaves and flowers similar to those of K. ericifolia but has differently shaped bracteoles. It is often common in wet areas around Perth.

== Description ==
Kunzea glabrescens is a shrub or tree with several main stems and many branches and which grows to a height of up to 4 m (10 ft). The leaves are linear to lance-shaped with the narrower end towards the base, mostly 5–8 mm (0.2–0.3 in) long and less than 1 mm (0.04 in) wide with a petiole up to 1 mm (0.04 in) long. The flowers are arranged in dense heads of 18 to 28 mainly on the ends of the longer branches. The flowers are surrounded by egg-shaped bracts 2–3 mm (0.08–0.1 in) long and 1–2.5 mm (0.04–0.1 in) wide and pairs of broadly egg-shaped bracteoles which are 2 mm (0.08 in) long and 3 mm (0.1 in) wide. The floral cup is 3–4 mm (0.1–0.2 in) long and the five sepals are egg-shaped to triangular, glabrous and 1–2 mm (0.04–0.08 in) long. The five petals are 1–2 mm (0.04–0.08 in) long and pale yellow and there 30-45 stamens. Flowering mostly occurs in October and November and is followed by fruit which are urn-shaped capsules.

== Taxonomy and naming ==
Kunzea glabrescens was first formally described in 1996 by Hellmut R. Toelken from a specimen collected near Lake Goollelal in Greenwood and the description was published in Journal of the Adelaide Botanic Gardens. The specific epithet (glabrescens) is derived from the Latin word glaber meaning "hairless", "bald" or "smooth" and the suffix -escens meaning "becoming", referring to the leaves being hairless or becoming so with age. The genus was named after Gustav Kunze who was a professor of botany, entomologist and physician.

== Distribution and habitat ==
Kunzea glabrescens typically grows in sandy soil and is often found in wet depressions and along watercourses as far north as Gingin and then south through the Swan Coastal Plain, Peel region through the South West region and extending into the Great Southern region as far east as Albany.

== Conservation ==
This kunzea is listed as "not threatened" by the Government of Western Australia Department of Parks and Wildlife.
