= Brad Bootsma =

Australian rules footballer

Personal information
- Full name: Bradley Theodore Bootsma
- Born: 30 December 1972 (age 53); Perth, Western Australia
- Original team: Cockburn
- Debut: Round 8, 1 May 2000, Fremantle vs. Collingwood, at Telstra Dome

Playing career^{1}
Years	Club	Games (Goals)
1994–2005	South Fremantle	162 (108)
2000–2001	Fremantle	23 (7)
- ^{1} Playing statistics correct to the end of 2005.

Career highlights
- WAFL state team representative; WAFL state team captain; South Fremantle premiership side 1997; W. J. Hughes Medal 1998, 1999; South Fremantle captain 2002–05; North Albany premiership side 2007, 2008; Alan Barnett Medal 2008

Bradley Theodore Bootsma (born 30 December 1972) is a former Australian rules footballer who played for the Fremantle Football Club in the Australian Football League. He played as a half-back flanker or midfielder. Bootsma was recruited from South Fremantle in the West Australian Football League (WAFL) and is the father of former AFL footballer Josh Bootsma.

== AFL career ==
The Dockers surprised many when they selected Bootsma with their only pick in the 2000 pre season draft (2nd overall). Bootsma was recruited at the late age of 27.

After spending the first seven rounds of the 2000 season playing in the WAFL with South Fremantle, Bootsma was selected to make his debut in Round 8 against Collingwood at the Docklands Stadium in a rare (for AFL) Monday night game. A more than serviceable game saw Bootsma end up playing played 13 games in his debut season.

Bootsma played the first 10 games of 2001 and had more than 20 possessions in 5 of them. However, the tumultuous round 10 match against Richmond, Ben Allan's first as caretaker coach after Damian Drum was sacked, would be Bootsma's last, due initially to a knee injury and later he was unable to break into the team eager to rebuild for the future. He would remain on the Fremantle list for the 2002 season, but did not play another senior game. He retired from AFL football at the end of 2002.

== WAFL career ==
Bootsma gave great service to South Fremantle before and after his time at Fremantle. In 1997 he helped South to win the WAFL Premiership and he won the best and fairest award in 1999. On his return to South Fremantle in 2002 he was awarded the captaincy which he held until he retired from the WAFL before the start of the 2005 WAFL season.

== GSFL (North Albany) ==
Working in Albany as a Football Development Officer, Bootsma joined the North Albany Football Club and played for the club until 2009 and remains in a coaching role. He was an integral part of the 2005, 2006, 2007 and 2008 premiership sides, winning the Alan Barnett Medal for the best on ground in 2008. He has been coach of North Albany Football Club since 2007 and coached the club to premierships in 2007 and 2008. In 2009 the club made the Grand Final however lost to arch rivals Royals.

== Family ==
Bootsma's son Josh is also a footballer, and was drafted by the Carlton Football Club in the 2011 AFL draft., before being sacked by the Blues over disciplinary issues in June 2014.
