= Spencer Park, Western Australia =

Suburb of the City of Albany, Western Australia

Spencer Park
- Suburb
- Coordinates: 35°00′21″S 117°54′00″E
- Country: Australia
- State: Western Australia
- City: Albany
- LGA(s): City of Albany
- Location: 2.5 km (1.6 mi) from Albany

Government
  - State electorate(s): Albany
  - Federal division(s): O'Connor

Area
  - Total: 2.2 km^{2} (0.85 sq mi)

Population
  - Total(s): 3,445 (SAL 2021)
- Postcode: 6330
Suburbs around Spencer Park
Collingwood Heights	Collingwood Heights	Collingwood Park
Yakamia	Spencer Park	Seppings
Centennial Park	Mira Mar	Mira Mar

Spencer Park is a north-eastern suburb of Albany in southern Western Australia north-northeast of Albany's central business district. Its local government area is the City of Albany, and the suburb was gazetted in 1954.

== Geography ==
The suburb, named after Albany's first Government Resident Sir Richard Spencer RN and gazetted in 1954, is bounded by Ulster Road to the west and north, Collingwood Road to the southeast and North Road to the south. There are two housing estates in Spencer Park. Woodrise And Breaksea Estate. Woodrise is located in the southwest corner and Breaksea Estate is located in the northeast corner

== Facilities ==
Spencer Park contains a shopping centre, fuel station, a retirement home and the Albany Regional Hospital, as well as two schools: St Joseph's College, a Catholic school and a public primary school, Spencer Park Primary School. Spencer Park has a median age of 43.
