= Collingwood Park (stadium) =

Stadium in Albany, Western Australia

Coordinates: 35°0′3.74″S 117°55′7.8″E

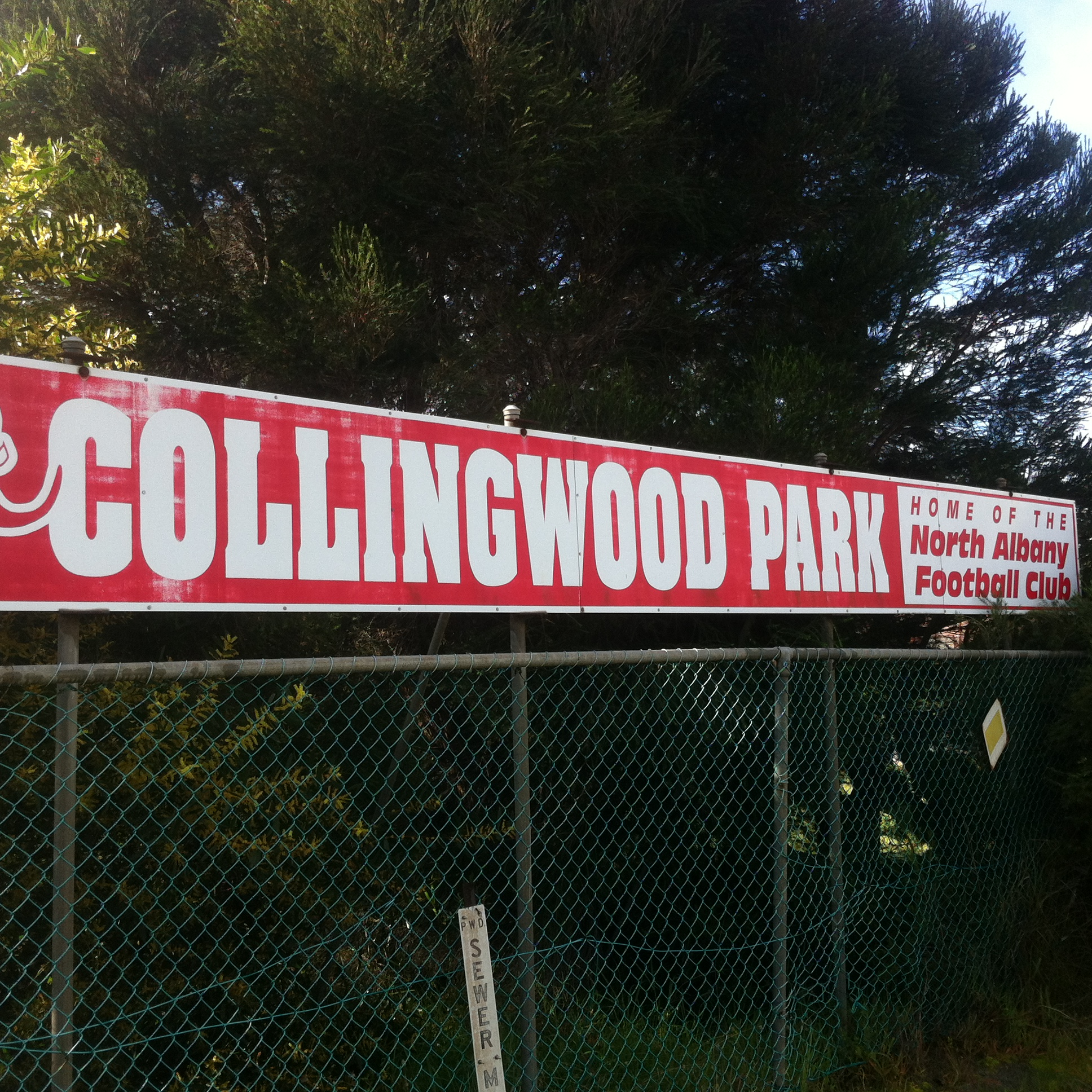
Collingwood Park sign

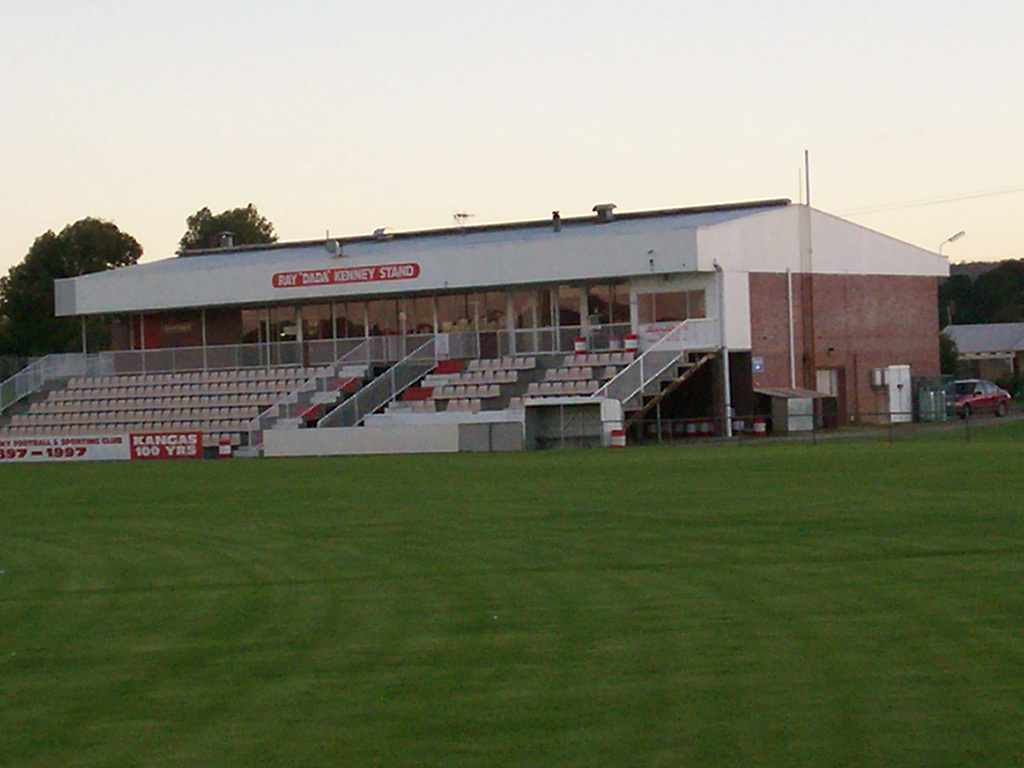
Collingwood Park - Ray Dada Kenney Stand 2007

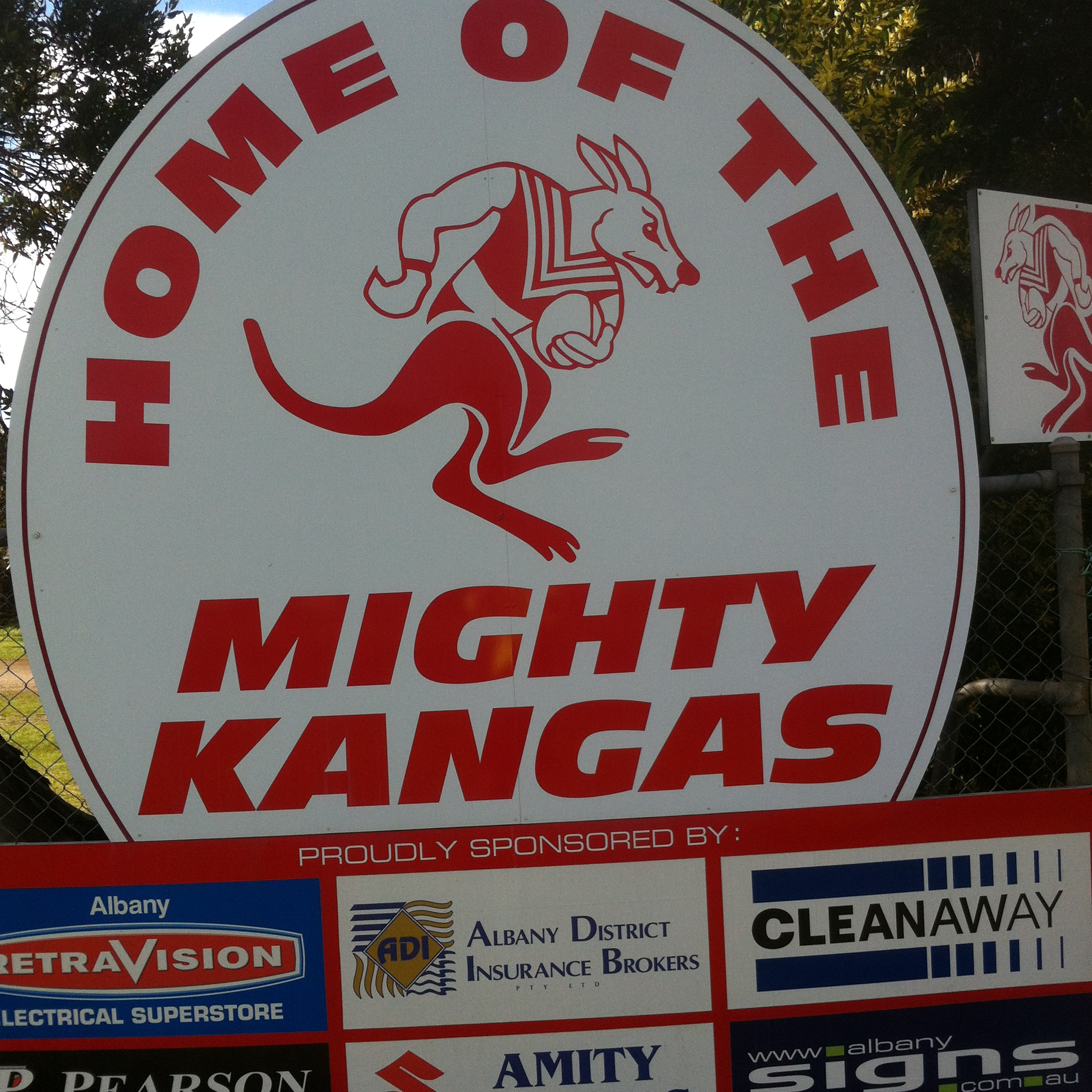
Kanga sign at Collingwood Park

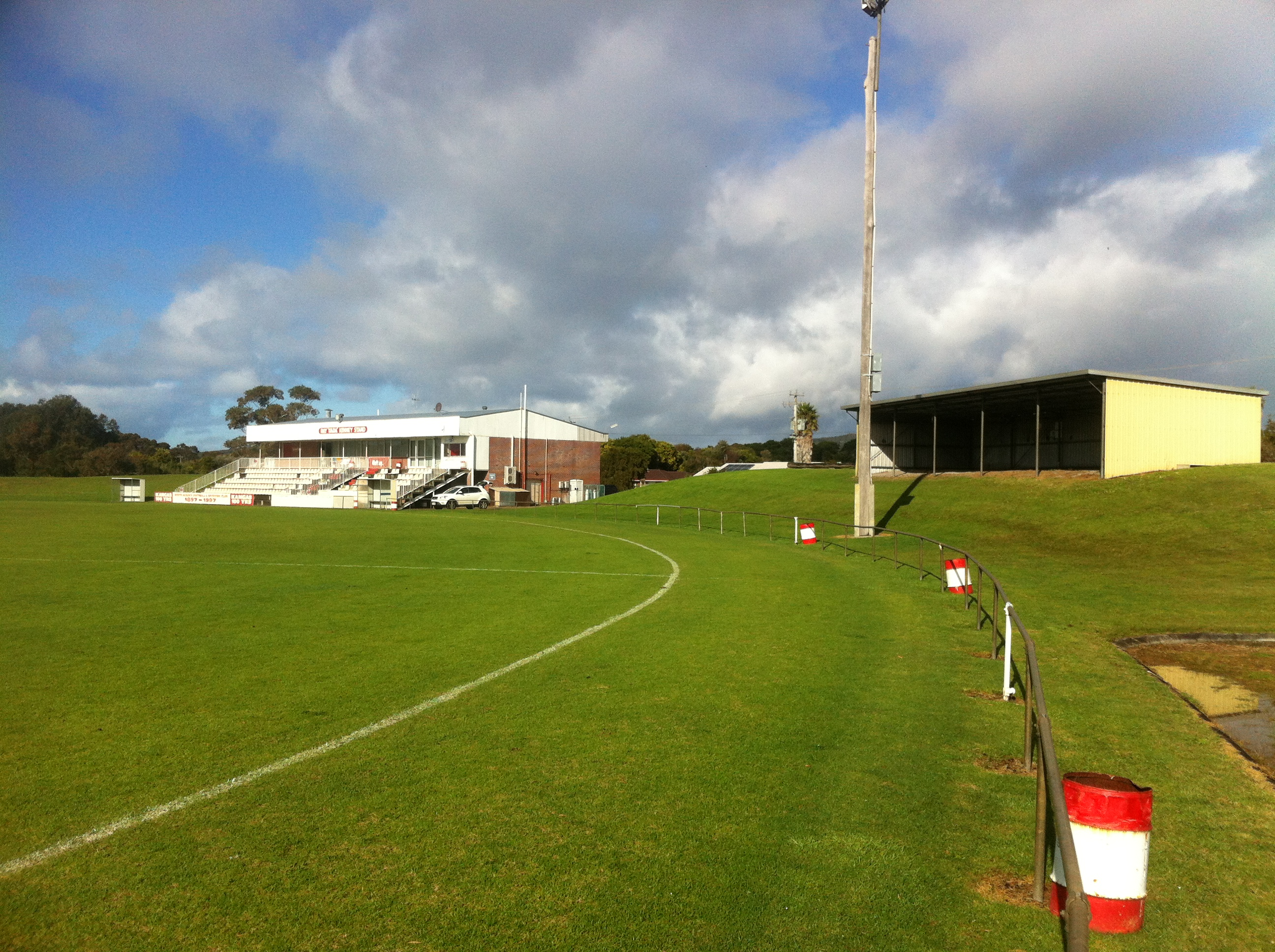
Ray Kenney stand and shed at Collingwood Park 2015

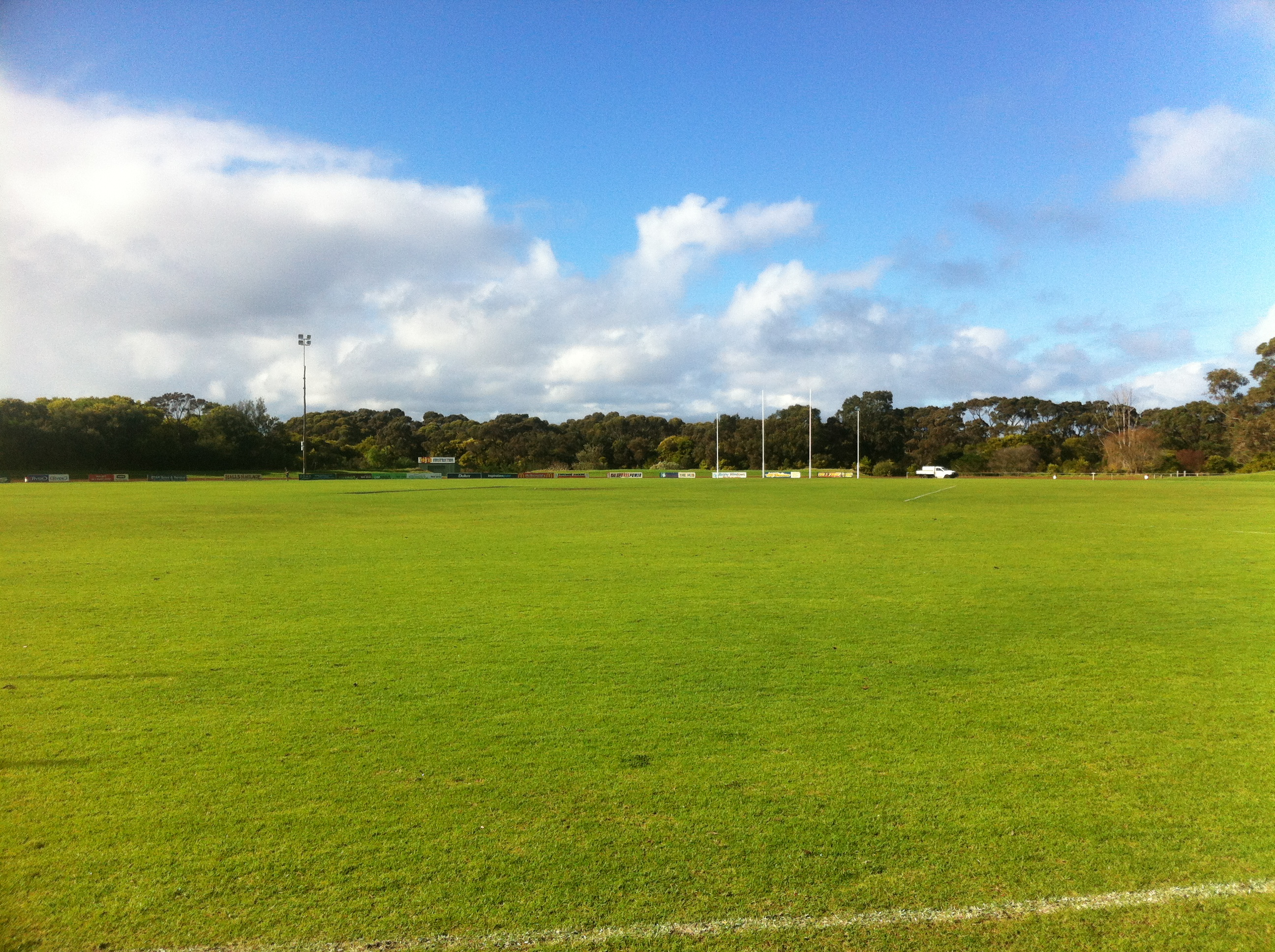
Southern goals at Collingwood Park

Collingwood Park is a stadium located in the suburb Collingwood Park in the city of Albany, Western Australia.

Collingwood Park is Albany's largest sport and recreational ground, and has hosted such events as the 2007 Crusty Demons West Coast Carnage Tour and the 2008 the AFL NAB Cup match between the West Coast Eagles and Collingwood Magpies.

== Overview ==
Collingwood Park is dominated by one main grandstand; The Ray "Dada" Kenney stand, Named after Ray Kenney who left the stadium's land to the club when he died. The "Dada" Stand holds the majority of the ground's spectators and is the only place with all-seater seating. It also holds North Albany's club rooms and main toilets as well as commentary boxes.

The opposite side of the ground outlook has grass banks surrounding it, and has 8 floodlights all around the ground. Being the East bank it has terraced hills sitting underneath the only scoreboard at the ground, often being operated by younger North Albany Kangaroo's supporters.

To the right of the Ray "Dada" Kenney stand is a "shed" that many supporters sit in.

== Sports teams ==
North Albany Football and Sporting Club own the ground, with the North Albany Kanga's Australian Rules Football team playing all home matches there, including all Under 17s, Colt, Reserves and Senior League teams.

The Albany Sharks, formed in 2009, also use Collingwood park as their home ground.

More recently, the Caledonian's Football Club play at the ground too.

== Events ==
In 2003, the Iraq national football team played a friendly at the ground against the Western Australian State Team; The game would end 6–1 to the Iraqis who would go on three years later to win the 2007 AFC Asian Cup. Crusty Demon's attracted a huge crowd of 9,000 plus to see there Albany leg of the West Coast Carnage Tour.

On 23 February 2008, An AFL Pre-Season practice was played at Collingwood Park between the West Coast Eagles and Collingwood. The game attracted a crowd of over 8,000 and the ticket sale profits were returned to Albany to help upgrade facilities. West Coast won the game by 33 points.

The stadium hosted a WAFL fixture on 17 April 2009 when South Fremantle Bulldogs beat Claremont Tigers by 17 points in front of a crowd of over 1800.
