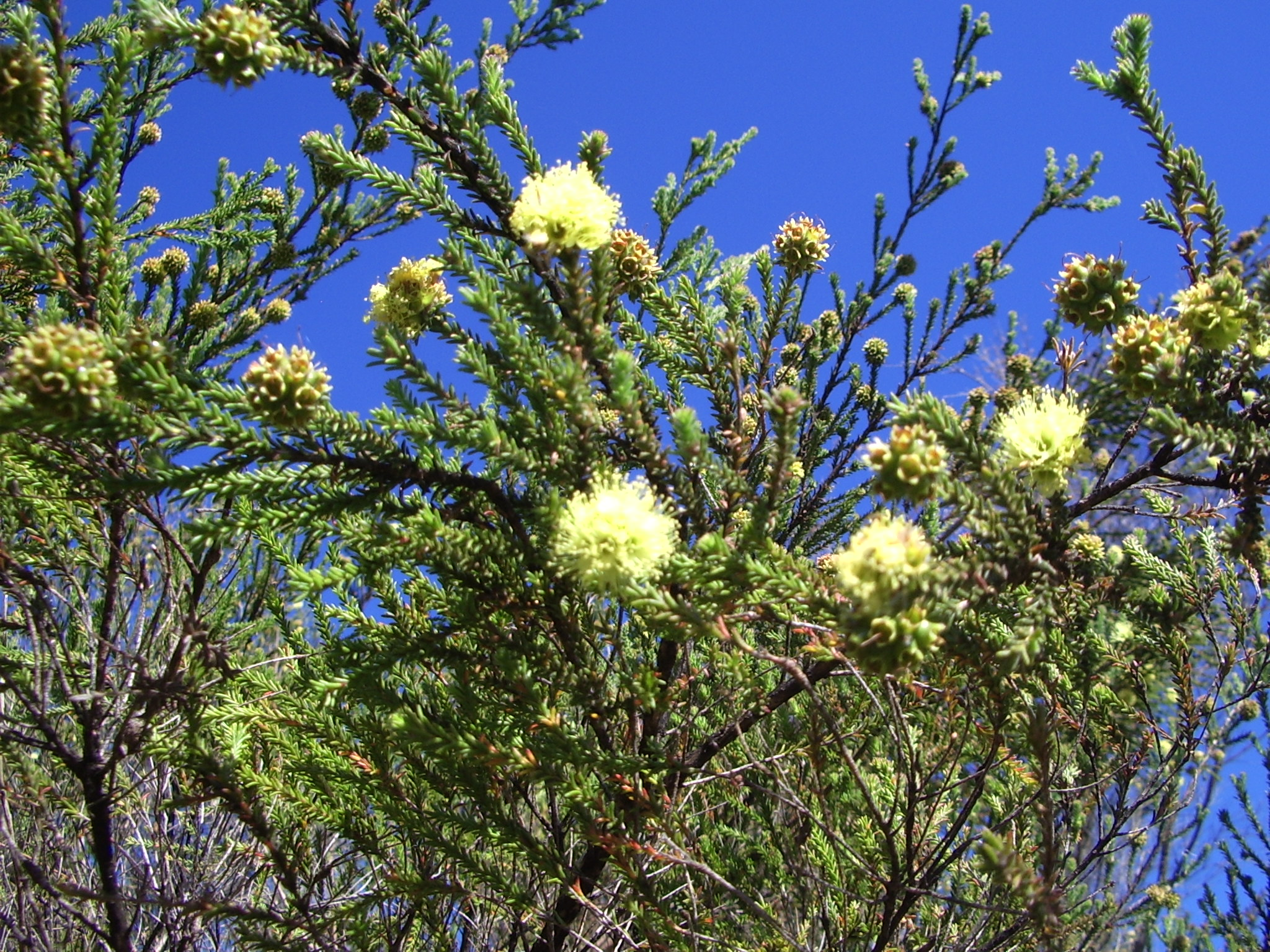
- Kunzea ericifolia growing near Lake Seppings

Scientific classification
- Kingdom: Plantae
- Clade: Tracheophytes
- Clade: Angiosperms
- Clade: Eudicots
- Clade: Rosids
- Order: Myrtales
- Family: Myrtaceae
- Genus: Kunzea
- Species: K. ericifolia

Binomial name
- Kunzea ericifolia (Heynh.)

= Kunzea ericifolia =

Spearwood

Species of flowering plant

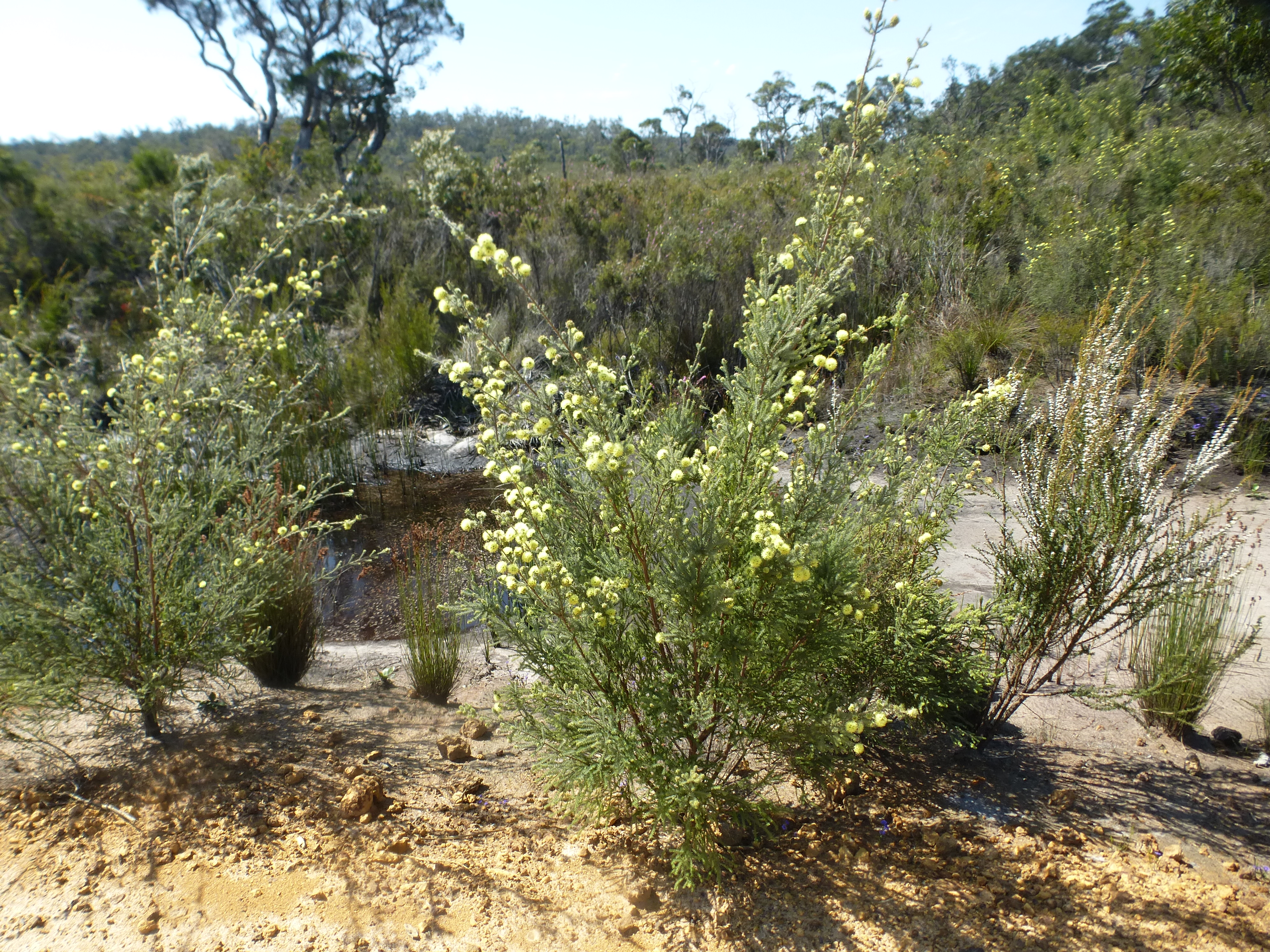
Habit

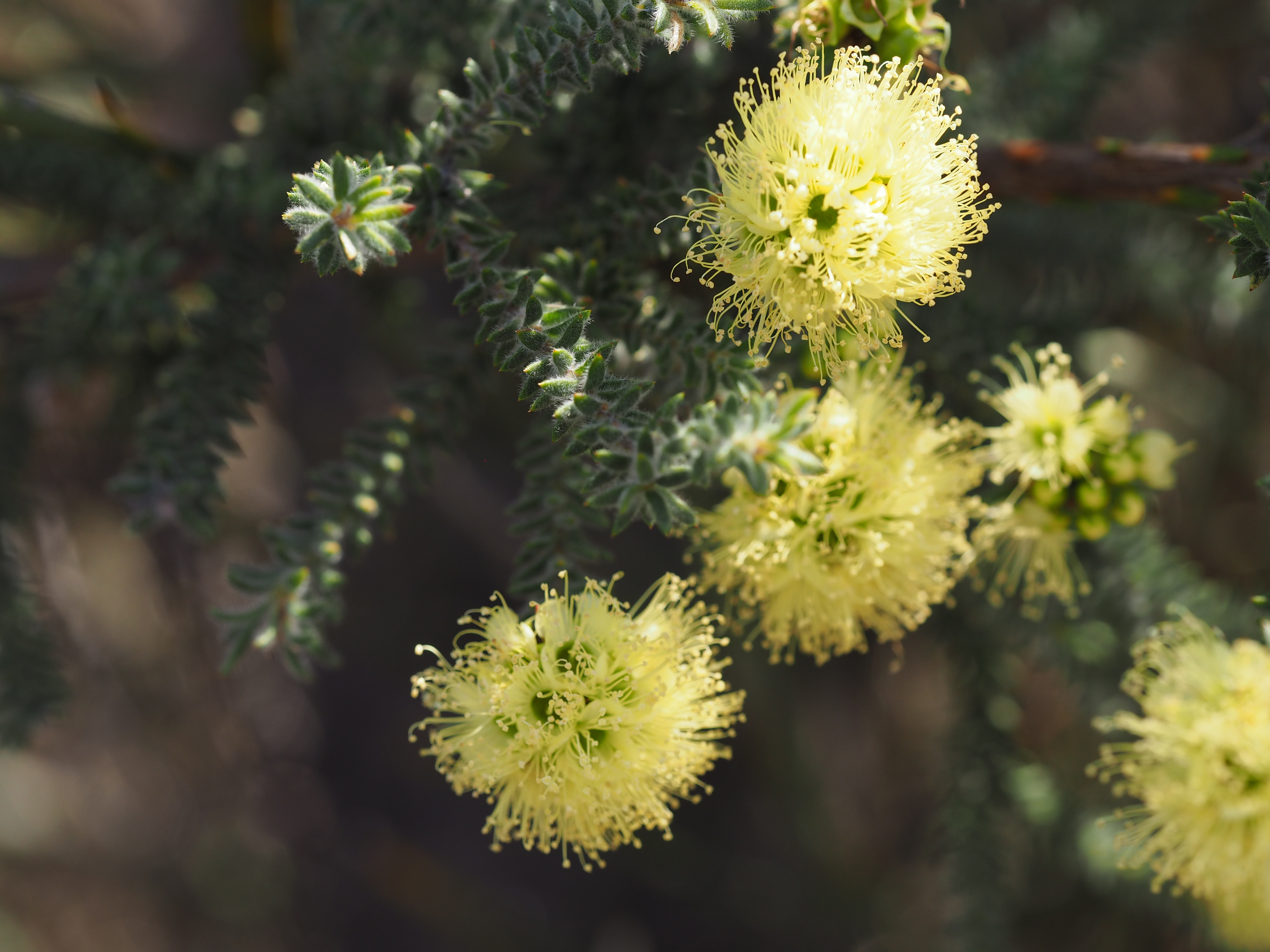
Leaves and flowers

Kunzea ericifolia, commonly known as spearwood, native tree or yellow kunzea, or as kitja boorn, poorndil or condil by the Noongar people, is an erect woody evergreen shrub that is endemic to Western Australia. It has soft green linear leaves and spherical heads of usually yellow flowers in spring.

== Description ==
Kunzea ericifolia is a woody erect shrub, often multi-stemmed, that can grow to a height of 6 metres but is typically about 2 metres (7 ft) tall. The long and slender stems divide from the base, and continue to divide into finer, flexible and narrowly angled branches. The shrub has a crown of soft pale green foliage. The leaf are simple in structure with linear form growing to a length of about 10 millimetres (0 in) with a width of 1 millimetre (0 in). Flowering occurs in spring (July to December) and produces small round flower approximately 10 millimetres (0 in) in diameter. The globular blossom is perfumed and yellow, cream or white in color and occurs in clusters and the ends of branches. Flowers are followed by small single celled fruits that contain many small seed that are dispersed once the fruit is ripe. The bark is fibrous, rough and grey in colour, often peeling in layers from the stem.

== Taxonomy and naming ==
Spearwood was first formally described in 1812 by James Edward Smith who gave it the name Metrosideros ericifolia from a specimen collected by Archibald Menzies during the Vancouver expedition's stop at King George Sound in 1791. The description was published in The Cyclopedia edited by Abraham Rees. When he published his description of the genus Kunzea in 1828, Ludwig Reichenbach referred to Kunzea ericifolia but did not validly publish the name. However, in 1840 Gustav Heynhold published the name in Alphabetische und Synonymische Aufzahlung der in den Jahren 1840 bis 1846 in den europäischen Gärten eingeführten Gewächse nebst Angabe ihres Autors. The specific epithet (ericifolia) is a reference to the apparent similarity of the leaves of this species to those of Erica in the family Ericaceae.

== Distribution ==
Kunzea ericifolia is found in the Southwest Australia region. Populations of this species are found as far north as Gingin and as far east as Bremer Bay on the south coast. The largest populations occur around Albany. Many communities are found along the coast-line. A southeastern population is found in the Fitzgerald River National Park. Stands are often found in transition areas between wetlands and drier regions.

The name of the suburb Spearwood in Perth is taken from K. ericifolia. When the developer James Morrison sub-divided the area in 1897 creating the Spearwood Garden Estate it was the first time the name was used.

== Ecology ==
Kunzea ericifolia grows in sandy well drained soil. Found to grow in peaty soils, quartzite and grey sand. Grows well in moist conditions and along the margins of watercourses, lakes and seasonally wet swamps. Can also be found growing amongst rocks in more open and elevated positions. Requires good drainage and a sunny or slightly shaded position. It is ideally suited to mediterranean conditions, can withstand a moderate frost and will grow in more humid conditions.

K. ericifolia is susceptible to bushfire, which will destroy a thicket, however the seedlings can quickly repopulate an area after these events. The stands are often composed of plants of a similar age and size for this reason. The species can form dense thickets and produces large amounts of leaf litter, an environment occupied by a diverse range of orchid species that includes two rare hammer orchids. The stands also provide shelter to fauna, the New Holland honeyeater builds its nests amongst the branches.

== Uses ==
=== Use in horticulture ===
The plant has been cultivated for many years as an ornamental plant, though not as commonly as other species of Kunzea. It is easily propagated by seed or by cutting and considered to have greater potential as a garden plant than is currently recognised.

=== Indigenous use ===
As the name "spearwood" suggests, the plant was often used to make spears for hunting game.

=== Other uses ===
Studies have found that Kunzea ericifolia contains a powerful natural insecticide (called ericfolione) that has been extracted from the plant using hexane. The stems are used in commercial gardens as supports for climbing plants, for fencing and the construction of craypots. These uses have made the species vulnerable to illegal harvesting.

The early colonists used the plant to make a native tea that was considered refreshing but also used as a tonic. More recently it has been used to make bean poles inn market gardens and construct craypots.

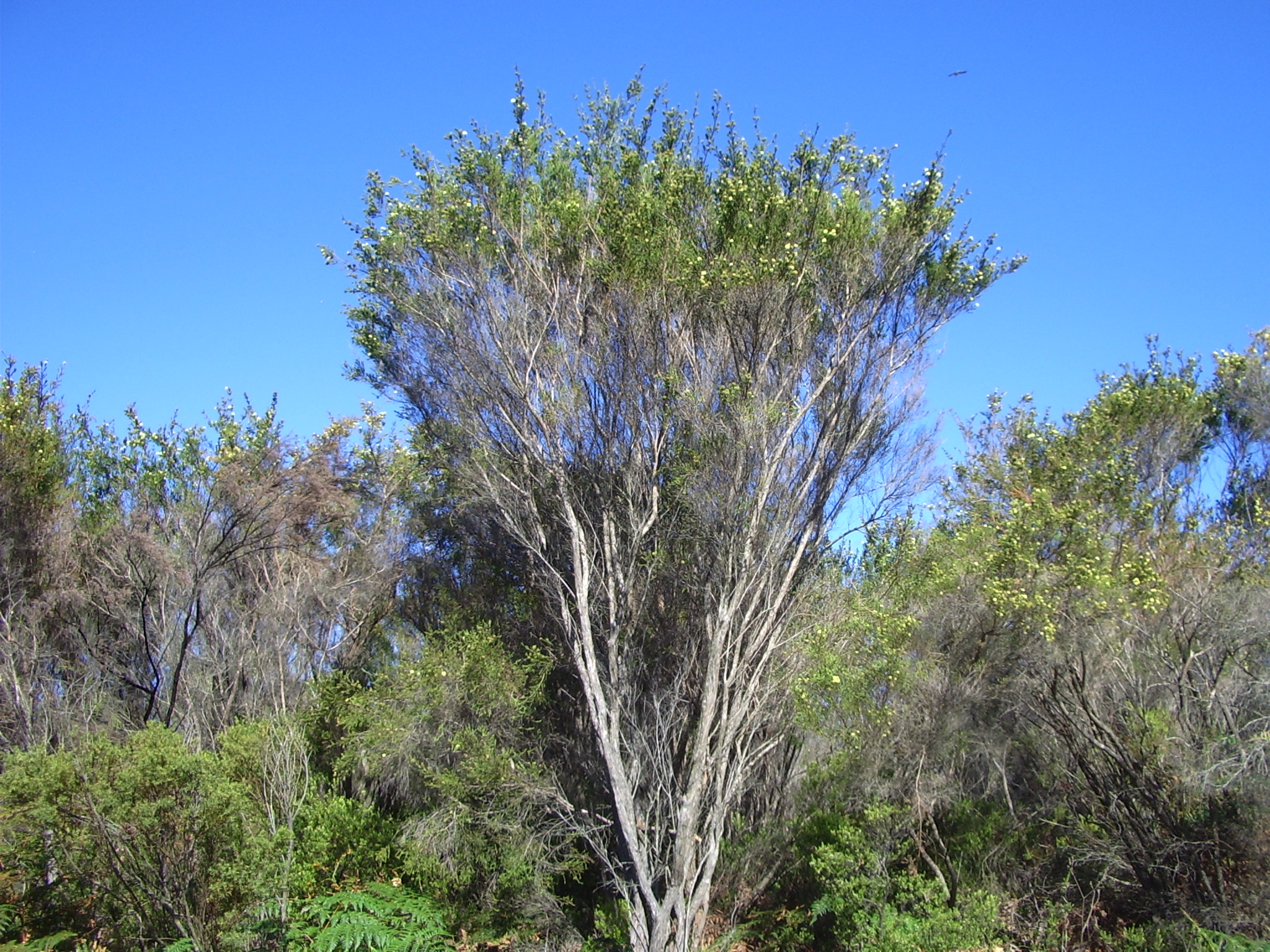
Kunzea ericifolia in a melaleuca thicket (approx 4 m tall), north side of Lake Seppings

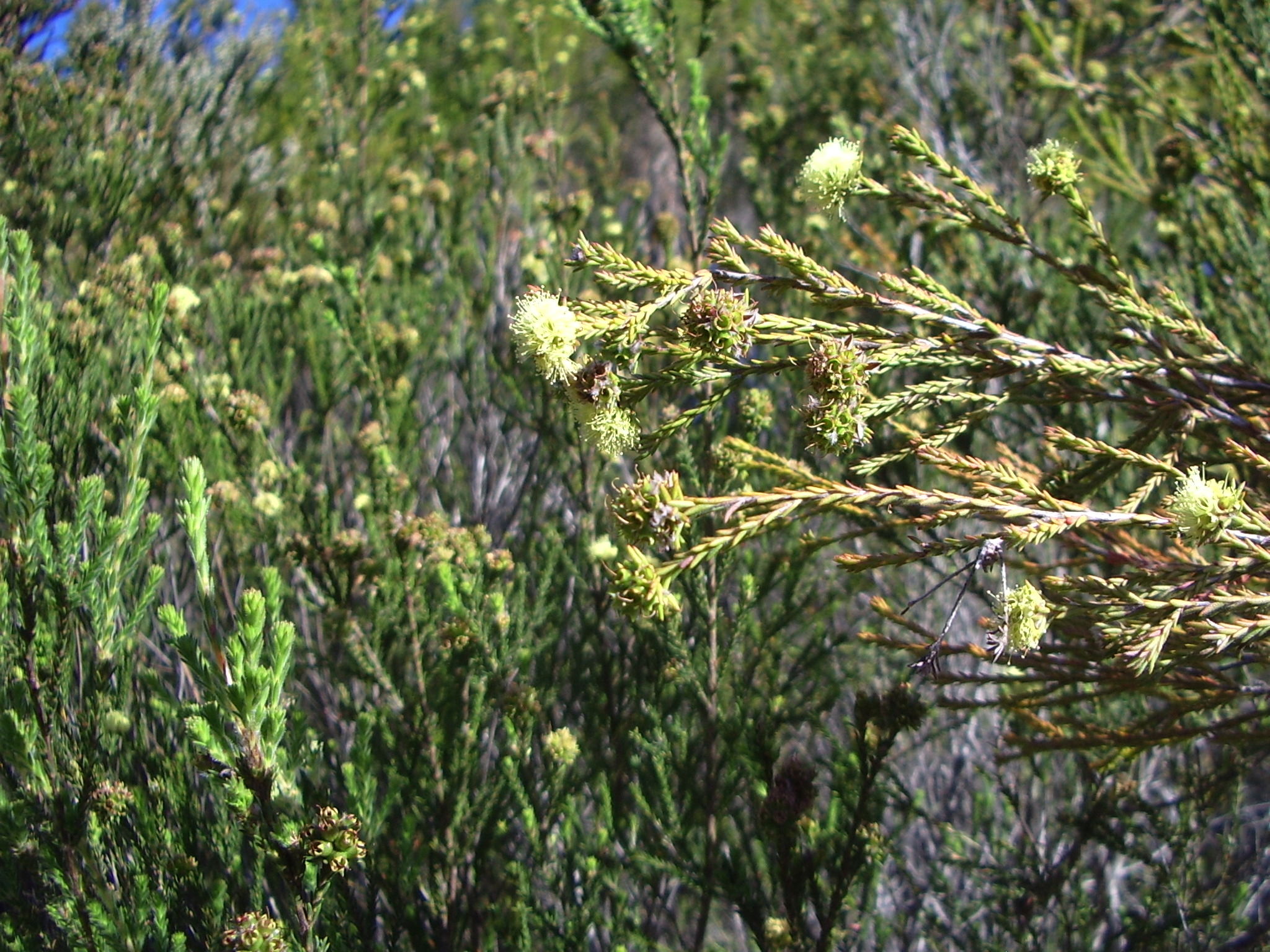
Kunzea ericifolia foliage, flowers and fruit.
