= Seppings, Western Australia =

Suburb of the City of Albany, Western Australia

Seppings
- Suburb
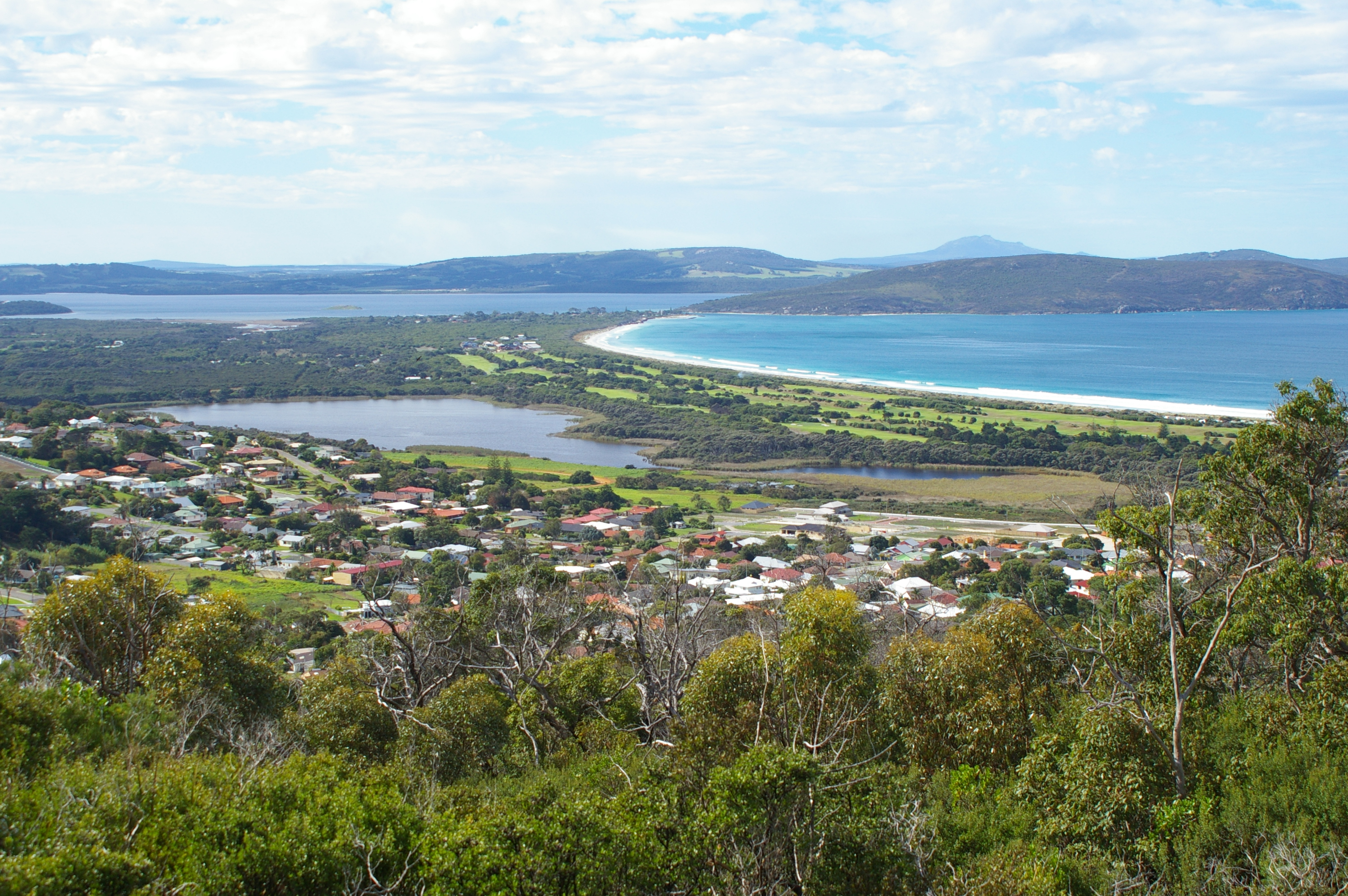
- The suburb and Lake Seppings from Mount Clarence

- Coordinates: 35.01451°S 117.91648°E
- Country: Australia
- State: Western Australia
- LGA: City of Albany

Government
  - State electorate: Albany
  - Federal division: O'Connor

Area
  - Total: 1.6 km^{2} (0.62 sq mi)

Population
  - Total: 177 (SAL 2021)
- Postcode: 6330
Suburbs around Seppings
Spencer Park	Spencer Park	Collingwood Park
Mira Mar	Seppings	King George Sound
Middleton Beach	Middleton Beach	King George Sound

Seppings is a suburb of the City of Albany in the Great Southern region of Western Australia. The suburb is bounded by the King George Sound to the east and home to Lake Seppings and surrounding wetlands. It also contains the south-western half of the Albany Golf Course. Only the area along the northern border of the suburb and a stretch along Middleton Beach are built up with houses.

The suburb is on the traditional land of the Minang people of the Noongar nation.

Lake Seppings, Tjuirtgellong in the Noongar language, and the Drew Street oak trees are both on the City of Albany's heritage list. The lake itself was named in 1827 by Edmund Lockyer after his cousins, Robert and John Milligen Seppings.
