= Lake Seppings =

Lake in Western Australia

- Tjuirtgellong (Nyungar)
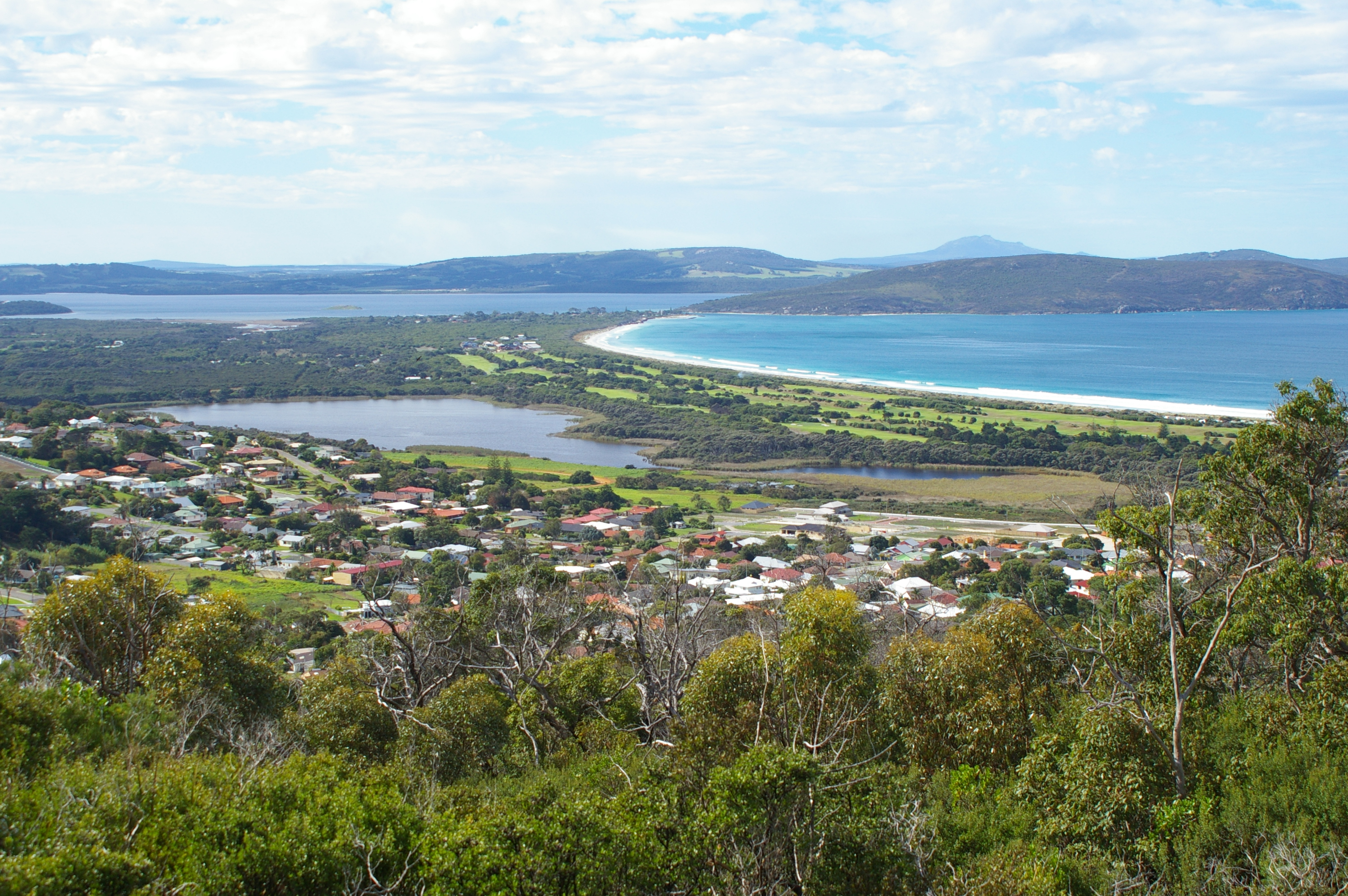
- View of Lake Seppings from Mount Clarence

- Location in Western Australia
- Interactive map of Lake Seppings
- Location: Great Southern region, Western Australia
- Coordinates: 35°0′48″S 117°54′48″E
- Type: Permanent freshwater
- Basin countries: Australia
- Designation: Lake Seppings Nature Reserve
- Max. length: 1.1 km (0.68 mi)
- Max. width: 0.4 km (0.25 mi)
- Shore length^{1}: 2.7 km (1.7 mi)
- Settlements: Albany, Western Australia
- ^{1} Shore length is not a well-defined measure.

Lake Seppings (Noongar: Tjuirtgellong) is a freshwater lake located within the city of Albany in the Great Southern region of Western Australia.

== Description ==
The lake is 3 kilometres (2 mi) east-north-east of the Albany city centre. The main bitumen roads that border Lake Seppings are Golf Links Road to the east, Troode Street to the north, Collingwood Road, Drew Street/Sleeman Avenue to west and Lake Seppings Drive to the south. The lake is nearly completely surrounded by a 2.7-kilometre (1.7 mi) compacted gravel footpath and wooden walkways. A car park for access to the path is located along Golf Links Road.

Lake Seppings is approximately 1.1 kilometres (0.7 mi) in length (from north to south) and the north end is approximately 400 metres (1,300 ft) in width. The lake narrows toward the southern end and the path crosses the lake approximately 250 metres (820 ft) before the southern tip. The lake is situated in the Lake Seppings nature reserve that has a total area of 17.1 hectares (42 acres).

== Fauna ==
Pobblebonk and motorbike frogs at Lake Seppings after dark, December 2016

Lake Seppings is regarded as an excellent place for bird watching, particularly for water-birds. Over one hundred different species of birds have been recorded on and about the lake. Wading species are often seen along the margins of the lake such as the Australian white ibis, yellow-billed spoonbill and the white-faced heron. Several species such as the blue-billed duck, musk duck, black swan, hoary-headed grebe, Australian pelican and Eurasian coot can be seen regularly on the surface of the lake. Birds that can be spotted amongst the lake vegetation include spotless crake, masked lapwing, dusky moorhen, purple swamphen and buff-banded rail.

== Flora ==
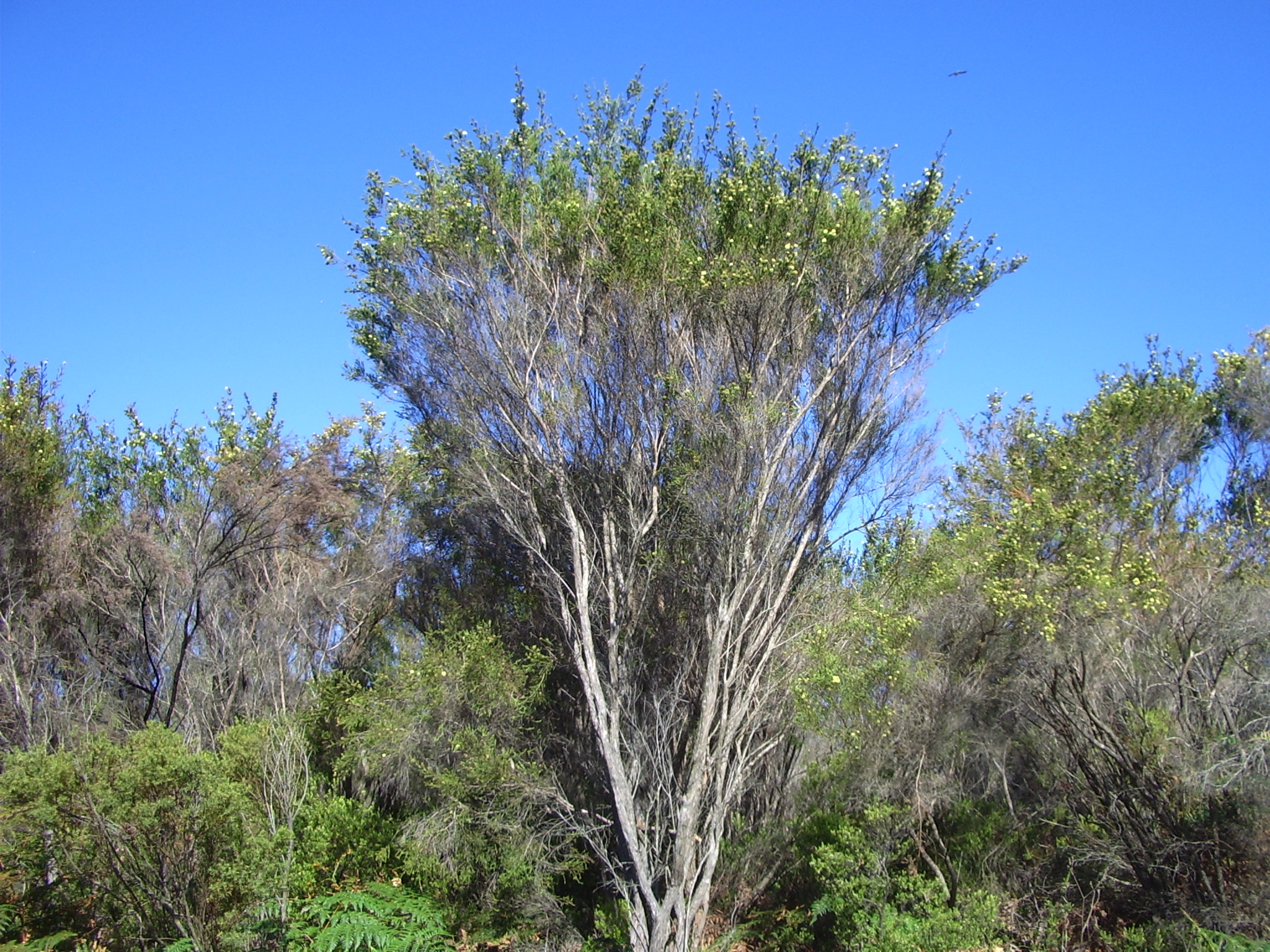
Kunzea ericifolia in a melaleuca thicket north side of Lake Seppings

Lake Seppings has a rich variety of vegetation around its margins. The immediate lakeside is surrounded by a mixture of bullrushes, reeds and sedges. The fringing trees are a mixture of Myrtaceae: Western Australian peppermint trees, spearwoods, paperbarks, native willows and wattles. Banksias are also found around the lake. The northern end of the lake is a dense melaleuca stand of the above-mentioned species. The north-western side of the lake has been cleared and is suffering from infestations of several weeds. These include kikuyu grass, bracken, blackberry, nasturtium, taylorina, and arum lily. Conservation groups are trying to restore the area starting with the old tip site which has been cleared and re-planted with several natives such as bluegums, Albany woolly-bushes and kangaroo paws.

== History ==
Around 20,000 years ago the sea level was about 130 metres (430 ft) lower than present and the coastline was about 4 kilometres (2.5 mi) from the lake's current shoreline. The sea level then rose and the lake was a shallow basin in the sea floor. This explains why cockle shells can be found preserved in the soil. Sea levels then fell to current levels about 8000 years ago leaving Lake Seppings 500 metres (1,640 ft) from the coast line.

The lake itself received its English name in 1827 by Major Edmund Lockyer, who named it after his cousins, Robert and John Milligen Seppings.

Lands along the eastern shore of the lake once were part of an estate belonging to Joseph Spencer of Balgarrup near Kojonup in 1884.

In 1887 it was proposed to the Albany Municipal Council by Councillor Robert Andrew Muir that the Council apply to the Government to grant the land surrounding Lake Seppings as a Commonage for the Municipality. The council later voted on the application in 1888 with the intention of establishing a botanical park along the shoreline for a portion of the lake and a timber reserve around the lake.

In 1888 Lake Seppings was declared a botanic garden. The lake was renamed "Albany Park" in 1900 and protected as a natural wetland. Between 1900 and 1970 the west side of the lake became a rubbish dump until 1972 when the department of fisheries and fauna suggested the lake become a water-fowl reserve.

The Apex club of Albany began work on the bird-walk during the 1980s. The Albany community demanded that the lake be protected and restored in 2000 and in 2004 the walking trail around the lake was completed.

In 2018, a community planting to establish an biodiversity urban corridor planted 22,000 trees and understorey plants in a 1.7 hectares (4 acres) area around the lake to revegetate the fringes and provide habitat for species such as the endangered western ringtail possum.

== Dreamtime ==
The local indigenous Australians are the Noongar people; their name for the lake is Tjuirtgellong, which means "the place of the long-necked tortoise". The lake has a special significance to the Noongar, who believe it to be the footprint of the spirit Djrat who created the south coast of Western Australia.

== Gallery ==
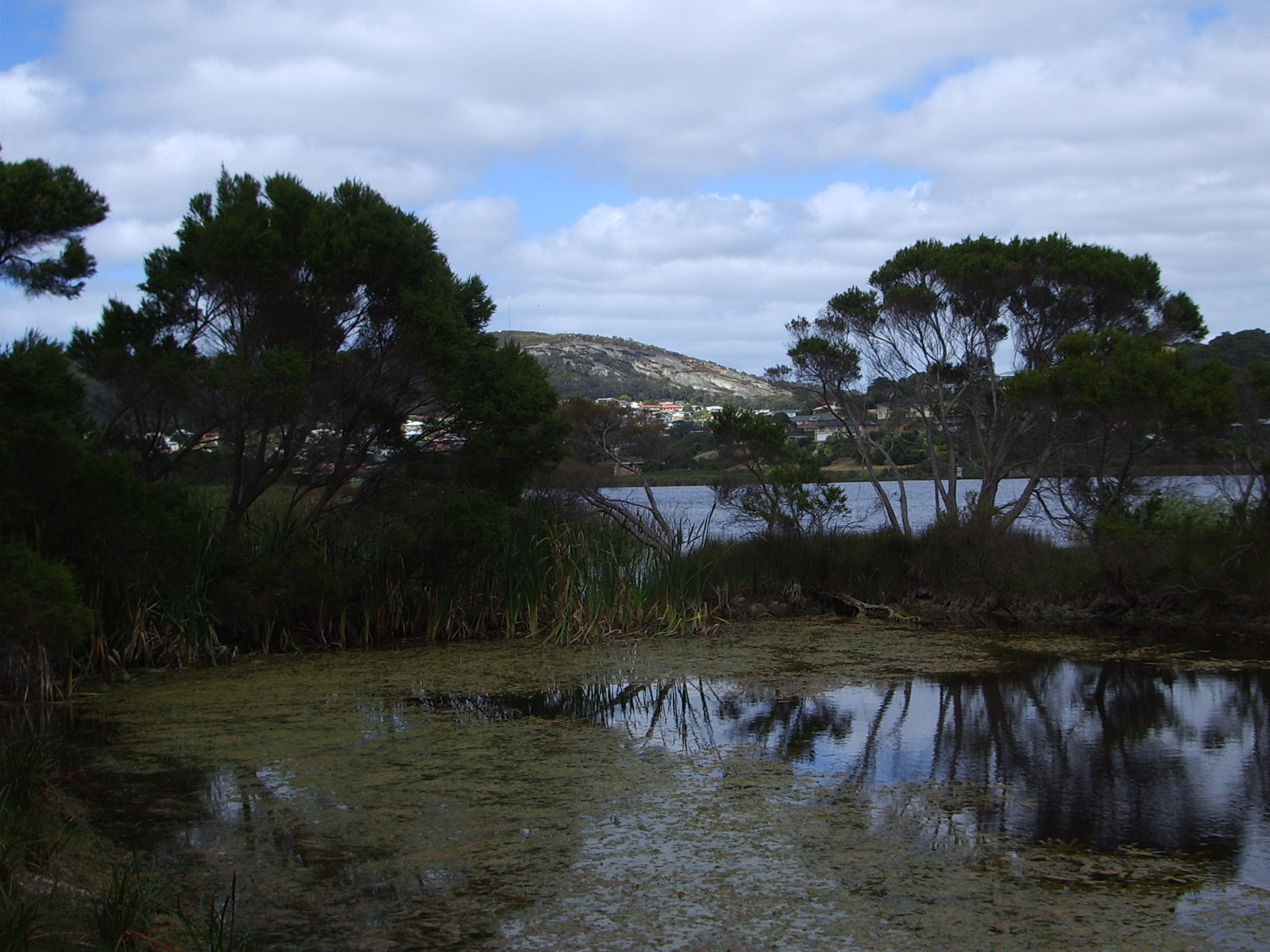
Lake Seppings Overflow Pond, the water is pumped to the golf course across the road

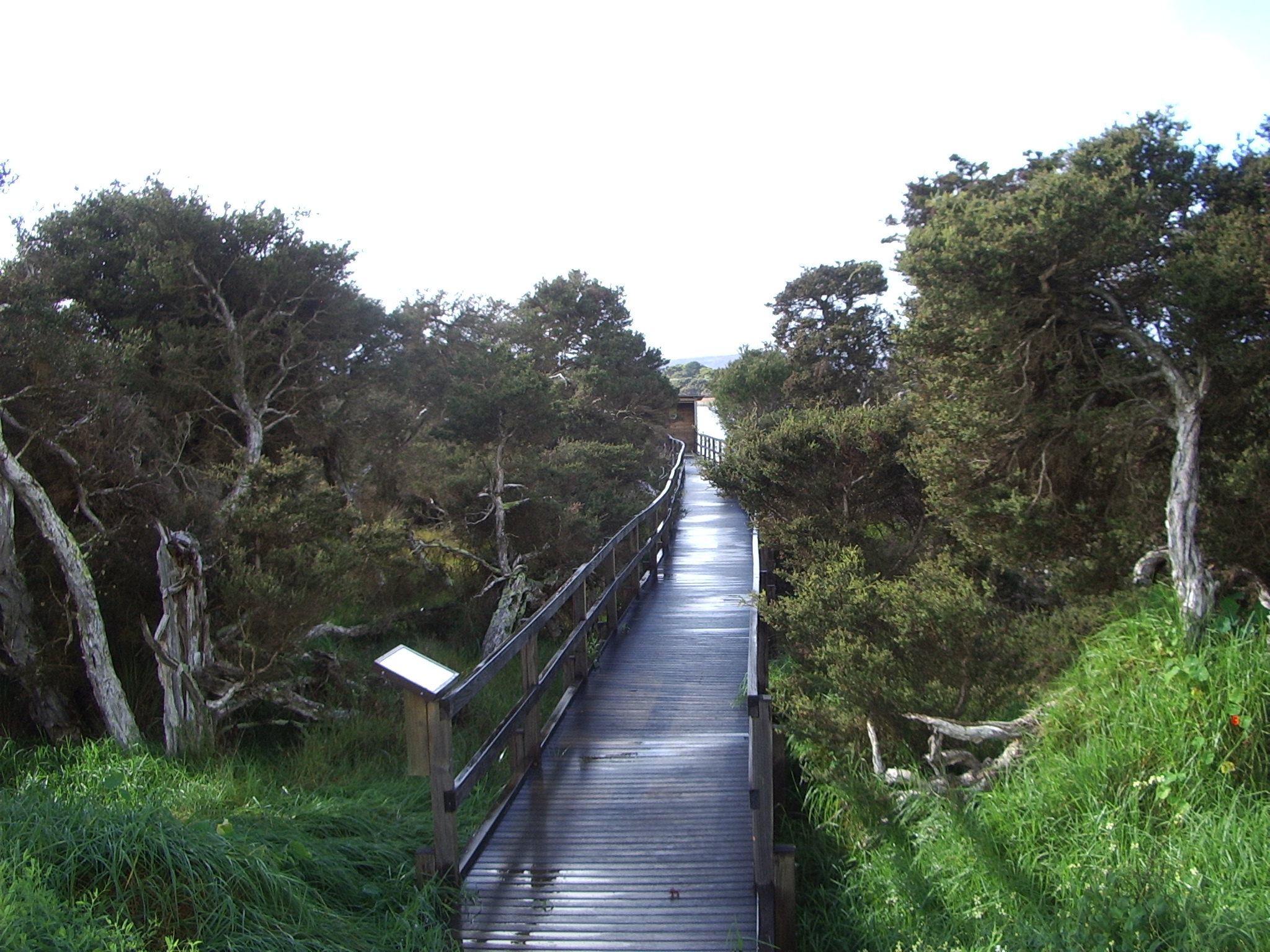
The bird hide on the western shore of Lake Seppings

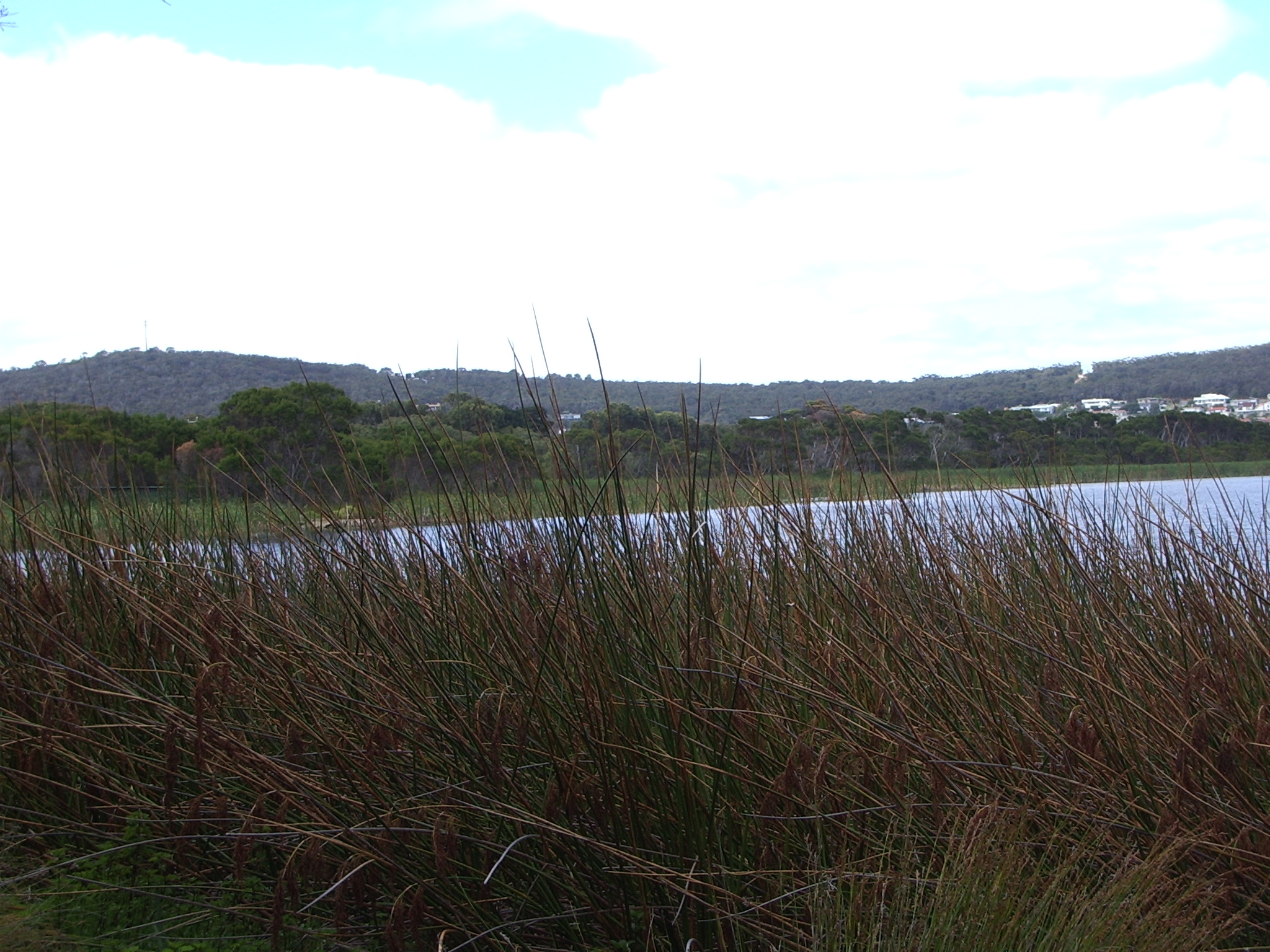
Southern end of Lake Seppings

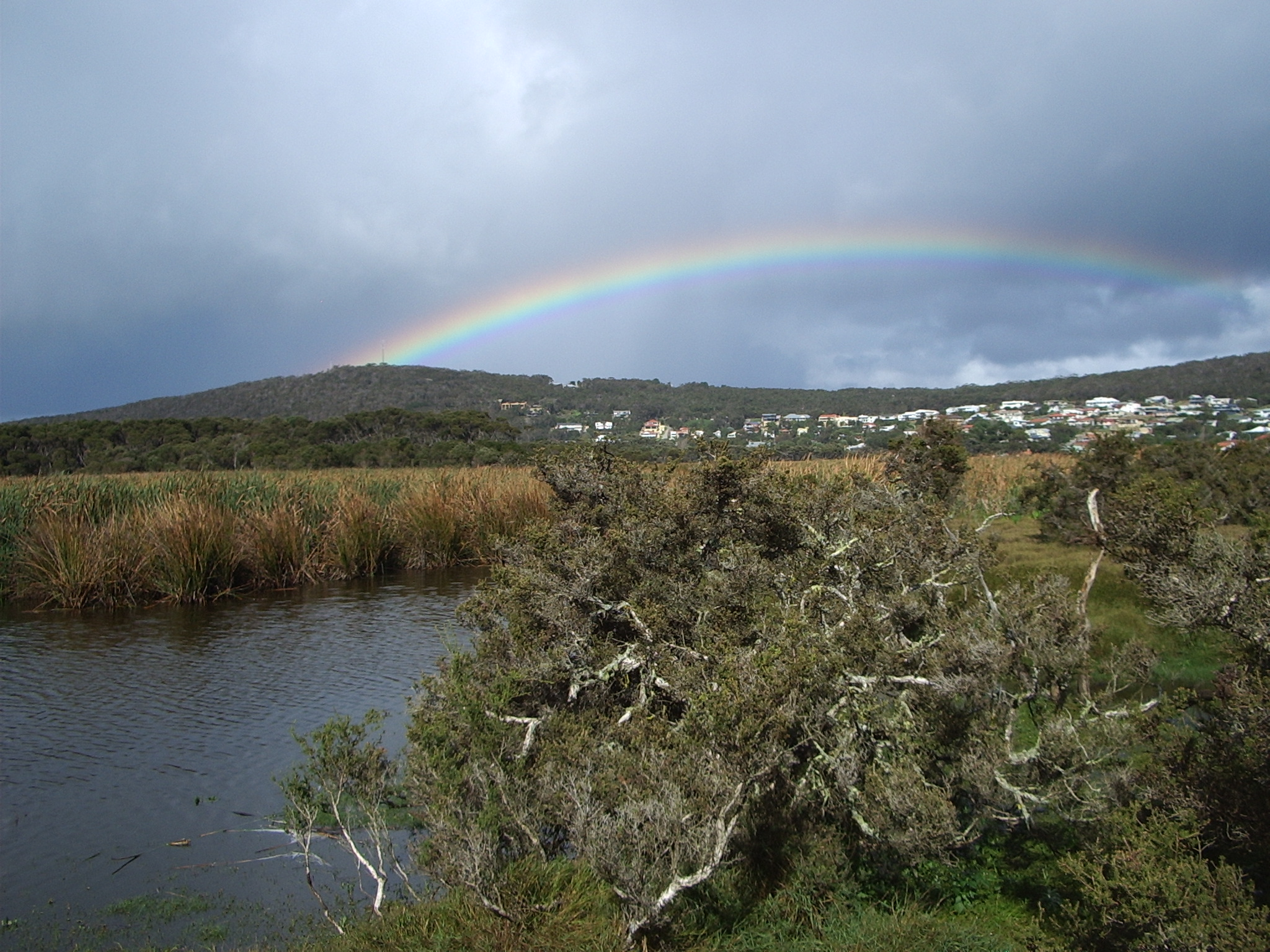
Western shore of Lake Seppings with Mount Adelaide and rainbow in the background

== See also ==
- List of lakes of Australia § Western Australia
