= Hannah Munyard =

Female Australian rules footballer

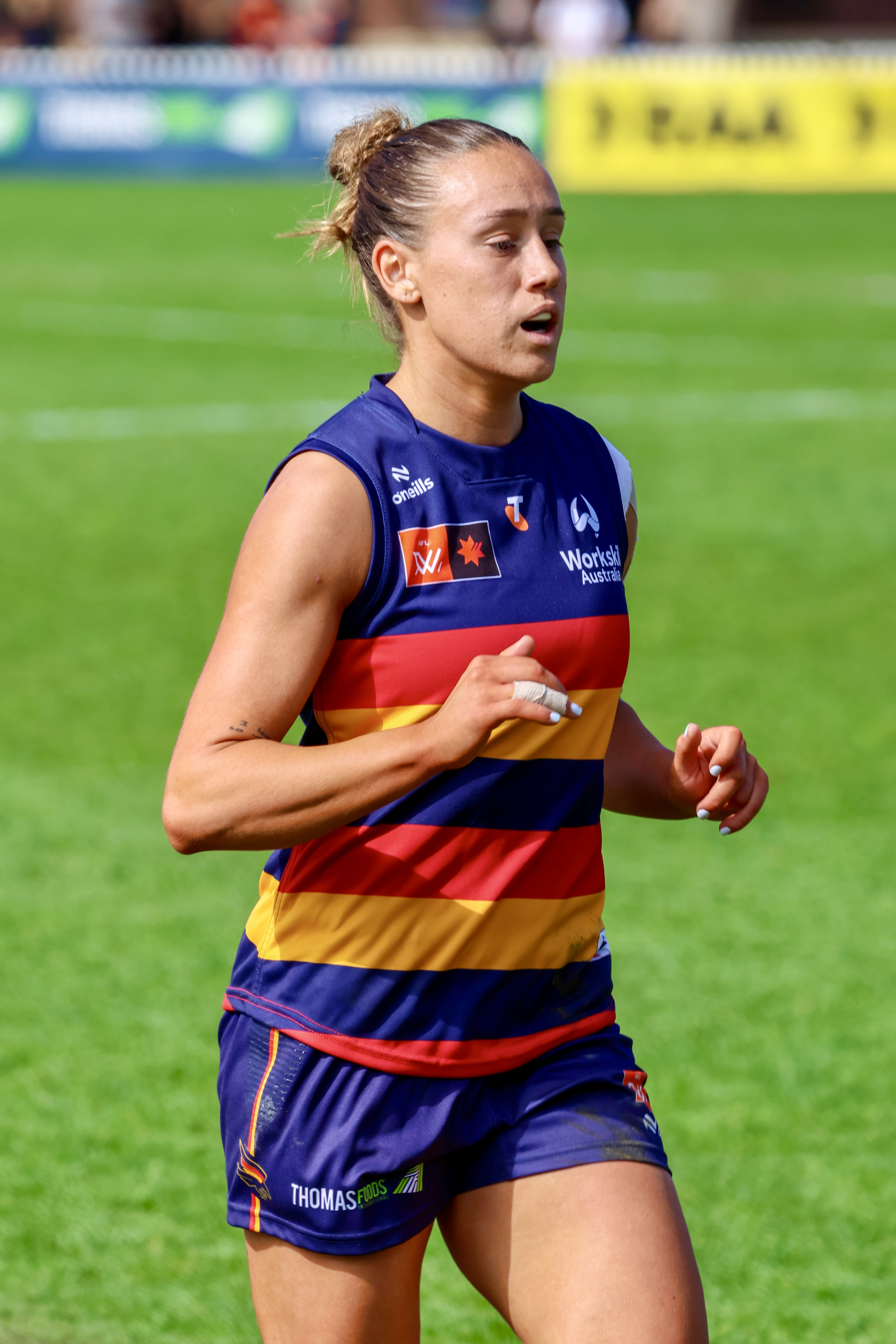
- Munyard with Adelaide in August 2026

Personal information
- Full name: Hannah Munyard
- Born: 4 August 2001 (age 25); South Australia
- Original teams: South Adelaide (SANFLW); Christies Beach; Mount Barker
- Debut: Round 4, 2020, Western Bulldogs vs. West Coast, at Leederville Oval
- Height: 162 cm (5 ft 4 in)
- Position: Midfielder

Club information
- Current club: Adelaide
- Number: 6

Playing career^{1}
Years	Club	Games (Goals)
2020	Western Bulldogs	3 (1)
2021–	Adelaide	32 (2)
Total		35 (3)
- ^{1} Playing statistics correct to the end of the 2023 season.

Career highlights
- AFL Women's premiership player: 2022 (S6)

Hannah Munyard (born 4 August 2001) is an Australian rules footballer who plays for Adelaide in the AFL Women's (AFLW).

== Early career ==
Originally from Strathalbyn, South Australia, Munyard played for Christies Beach and Mount Barker in her youth before being recruited by South Adelaide to play at amateur level. She won back-to-back premierships with the Panthers in 2018 and 2019 in the SANFLW as an under-18 player.

== AFL career ==
Munyard was signed to the Western Bulldogs for the 2020 season as a free agent after missing out on the draft. She made her league debut in round 4 of the same year during the defeat to West Coast.

After 3 games with the Bulldogs, Munyard was traded to Adelaide prior to the 2021 season. She missed out for selection in the 2021 Grand Final against Brisbane, but returned the following year to be an integral member of the season 6 premiership team. Munyard kicked one of the best goals of the 2024 season in round 6 against St Kilda with a checkside goal on the run.
