= Merv Neagle =

Australian rules footballer (1958–2012)

Personal information
- Full name: Mervyn Neagle
- Born: 7 March 1958
- Died: 23 August 2012 (aged 54); Tharbogang
- Original team: Dimboola
- Height: 181 cm (5 ft 11 in)
- Weight: 79 kg (174 lb)

Playing career^{1}
Years	Club	Games (Goals)
1977–1985	Essendon	147 (52)
1986–1990	Sydney	56 (19)
Total		203 (71)

Representative team honours
Years	Team	Games (Goals)
1980–1985	Victoria	
- ^{1} Playing statistics correct to the end of 1990.

Career highlights
- Essendon premiership player 1984

Mervyn Neagle (7 March 1958 – 23 August 2012) was an Australian rules footballer who represented Essendon and Sydney in the Australian Football League (AFL) during the 1970s and 1980s.

== Early life ==
Neagle grew up in Dimboola, a country town in western Victoria. There he formed a lifelong friendship with future teammate Tim Watson. They played junior football and basketball, and they shared a paper round.

== Football career ==
=== Essendon ===
Neagle joined Essendon, in 1976, preceding Watson who joined the club the following year as a 15-year-old. Both players made their senior debuts in 1977. Neagle finished second in the 1980 Brownlow Medal and equal fifth in 1981.

Neagle was selected to play for Essendon in the 1983 VFL Grand Final. He also played in the 1984 VFL Grand Final, where Essendon won their first premiership in 19 years. Neagle kicked the last goal of the match.

Neagle missed the 1985 premiership. He played in the second semi-final win over Hawthorn, but he was a late withdrawal on Grand Final day due to a leg injury.

=== Sydney Swans ===
At the end of the 1985 season Neagle transferred from Essendon to Sydney, where he played until his retirement.

Neagle was offered a rural coaching position in 1989, but chose to remain as a player with Sydney. In all, he played five seasons for Sydney before retiring at the end of the 1990 season.

== Post-AFL career ==
After retiring from AFL football, Neagle played and coached at a number of clubs around Australia, including:

- 1991 - Sale in Victoria
- 1992 - North Albury Football Club
- 1993 - Kingston Football Club, South Australia
- 1994 - Maryborough Football Club, Victoria
- 1997 & 1998 - Mangoplah-Cookardinia United-Eastlakes
- 2002 & 2003 - Merbein Football Club, Victoria. 2002 & 2003 Sunraysia Football League Premiers
- 2004 - East Devonport Football Club, Tasmania.
- 2006 & 2008 - Balranald Football Club, NSW. 2006 Central Murray Football League Premiers.
- 2008/2009 - St Mary's: 2009 - Northern Territory Football League premiership.
- 2009 - Mount Barker Football Club in the Great Southern Football League
- 2012 - Walla Walla Football Club: Hume Football League

== Personal life ==
Neagle worked as a truck driver and was the father of former Essendon player Jay Neagle, who was drafted under the father–son rule at the end of the 2005 AFL season.

== Death ==
Neagle died when the trailer of the B-double truck he was driving flipped over and crushed the cabin at Tharbogang, near Griffith, New South Wales.

Neagle's death at 54 years of age prompted a flow of tributes from former teammates and associates. Coach Kevin Sheedy recalled that Neagle:

...was not only a brilliant footballer but was also a real character. Merv was a very tenacious, hard-running player and his courage and toughness were typical of Essendon teams of that era. He had great physicality for a wingman and was a terrific kick for goal on the run. He also gave a lot back to country football after he retired, and along with Tim Watson was one of the finest players to come out of Dimboola. Merv has left us all too soon but has left those who knew him with many great memories.
