= Railways Football Club =

Football club based in Albany, Western Australia

Names
- Full name: Railways Football and Sporting Club
- Former name(s): Railways Football and Tigers Sporting Club, East Albany and Albany Railways
- Nickname: Tigers
- Former nickname: Railways
- Motto: Year of the Tiger

2019 season
- After finals: NA
- Home-and-away season: 2nd

Club details
- Founded: 1946
- Colours: Yellow and Black
- Competition: Great Southern Football League
- Chairperson: Andrew Want
- Coach: Mark Bayliss
- Captain: Bodhi Stubber
- Ground: Tigerland

Railways Football Club is an Australian rules football club based in Albany, Western Australia. The club has played in the Great Southern Football League since 1991. Prior to this they played in the Southern Districts Football League (SDFL) before it merged with the Central Great Southern Football League (CGSFL) to form the GSFL.

== The Club ==
The Railways Football Club, Albany (The Tigers) have been around since the 1946. They have also been called the East Albany and the Albany Railways. They play in the Great Southern Football League alongside Albany Sharks, North Albany Kangas, Royals, Denmark Walpole Magpies and the Mt Barker Bulls.

Their guernseys are the same as Australian Football League club Richmond - black with a yellow strip going from the left shoulder to the right hip.

== The derby ==
Railways have a strong rivalry with Royals Football Club. Big crowds always turn up to watch the game.

== History ==
The founders of the Albany Football Association decided to create wards for the towns new football competition. There were three wards, North, East and West. All matches were to be played at the Parade Street Oval. In 1897 football players from the East Ward formed a club called the East Albany Football Club.

For the next 40 years they played as East Albany until WWII suspended football in the town. In 1946 Railways football club was formed.

Railways have won five league premierships in 1961, 1985, 1986, 2012 and 2013.

== Honours ==
=== Premierships since 1991 (Start of GSFL) ===
League: 2012, 2013, 2021, 2022

Reserves: 1993, 1996, 2001, 2003, 2013, 2018

Colts: 1991

Under 17s: 2013, 2021

Women's Team: 2022

=== Kleemann Medalists (Best in League) ===
1992 M.Thomson

1993 G.Hooper

1996 B.Prater

2005 B.Parker

2007 Scott Hillman

2015 Zane Marwick

2018 Joel Want

2019 Logan Stubber

2020 Matthew Palfrey, Kane Shephard

=== Gillies Medalists (Best in Colts) ===
2010 Zane Marwick

2019 Henrick Alforque

2021 Toby Hall, Jack Stephens

=== Leading Goal Kickers for the League ===
1996 J.King 85 Goals

2000 S.Plaisted 81 Goals

2006 B.Parker 56 Goals

2007 B.Parker 63 Goals

2012 N.Eades ?? Goals

2018 K Gibbs 45 Goals

=== Charlie Puch Medal ===
2012 Jayden Scott

2018 Hayden Davies

2019 Jarrad Norton

== The Women's League Team ==
The Railways women's league team, "The Tigeress" plays in the Great Southern Women's Football League, competing since its inception in 2016. The team has been competitive in every season, making the finals on a number of occasions. The ladies won their first flag in 2022 after a stellar season, only losing one game throughout the normal home and away season. They beat Denmark 40-12 to capture the flag and make history for the club. #T22

Kanisha Bennell was named highest goal scorer of the competition after kicking 27 goals in the regular season.

== Ground ==
Railways are based at Tigerland, an oval in Centennial Park, Western Australia which is adjacent to Centennial Oval, the home ground of their rivals Royals.
