= Upper Great Southern Football League =

Australian rules football competition

- Sport: Australian rules football
- Founded: 1959; 67 years ago
- No. of teams: 8
- Website: GameDay

The Upper Great Southern Football League (UGSFL) is an Australian rules football competition based in the state of Western Australia, incorporating teams from towns located within the Great Southern, Wheatbelt and Peel regions. The league was formed in 1959 from a merger of the town competitions in Wagin and Narrogin.

The representative side from the UGSFL won the 2009 WA Country Football Championships in A Section, defeating the Avon Football Association.

== Clubs ==
As of the 2025 season, eight clubs compete in the UGSFL.

=== Locations ===
Locations of the Upper Great Southern FL clubs

=== Current ===
Club	Jumper	Nickname	Home Ground	Former League	Est.	Years in UGSFL	UGSFL premierships	
Club	Jumper	Nickname	Home Ground	Former League	Est.	Years in UGSFL	Total	Years
Boddington		Eagles	Boddington Town Oval, Boddington	NFA	1946	1959–	10	1989, 1990, 1991, 1995, 2002, 2012, 2018, 2019, 2022, 2024
Brookton-Pingelly		Panthers	Brookton Town Oval, Brookton and Pingelly Town Oval, Pingelly	–	1997	1997–2022, 2024	1	2003
Katanning Wanderers		Tigers	Quartermaine Oval, Katanning	GSFL	1922	2003–	3	2017, 2021, 2023
Kukerin-Dumbleyung		Cougars	Nenke Oval, Kukerin and Stubbs Park, Dumbleyung	CGSFL	1989	1991–	7	1992, 1993, 1996, 1998, 2001, 2005, 2006
Narrogin Hawks		Hawks	Narrogin Town Oval, Narrogin	–	2004	2004–	2	2015, 2026
Wagin Bulldogs		Bulldogs	Matera Oval, Wagin	–	2005	2005–	0	–
Wickepin		Warriors	Wickepin Town Oval, Wickepin	WFA	c.1913	1960–	8	1965, 1967, 1974, 1975, 1981, 2007, 2008, 2025
Williams		Cats	Williams Town Oval, Williams	NFA		1959–	11	1982, 1983, 1987, 1997, 2009, 2010, 2011, 2013, 2014, 2016, 2020

=== Former ===
Club	Jumper	Nickname	Home Ground	Former League	Est.	Years in UGSFL	UGSFL premierships		Fate
Club	Jumper	Nickname	Home Ground	Former League	Est.	Years in UGSFL	Total	Years	Fate
Cuballing		Tigers	Cuballing Cricket Ground, Cuballing	NFA	1907	1959–1985	9	1961, 1963, 1966, 1968, 1969, 1970, 1971, 1973, 1977	Folded after 1985 season.
Lake Grace		Bombers	Lake Grace Town Oval, Lake Grace	LGKDFA		1983-1993	0	–	Moved to Ongerup FA in 1994
Narrogin Imperials			Narrogin Town Oval, Narrogin	NFA		1959–1969	0	–	Folded after 1969 season.
Narrogin Eagles (Railways 1959-93)	(1959–93)(1994–2003)	Eagles (post 1993)	Narrogin Town Oval, Narrogin	NFA		1959–2003	2	1972, 1978	Merged with Towns in 2004 to form Narrogin Hawks
Towns	(1959-93)	Lions (post 1993)	Narrogin Town Oval, Narrogin	NFA		1959–2003	4	1959, 1960, 1986, 1988	Merged with Narrogin Eagles in 2004 to form Narrogin Hawks
Pingelly		Panthers	Pingelly Town Oval, Pingelly	CFA		1971–1991	2	1979, 1984	Entered recess in 1991. Merged with Brookton to form Brookton-Pingelly in 1997
Wagin		Magpies	Matera Oval, Wagin	–	1983	1983–2004	5	1985, 1994, 1999, 2000, 2004	Merged with West Arthur to form Wagin Bulldogs in 2005.
Wagin Federals			Matera Oval, Wagin	WFA		1959–1982	0	–	Merged with Wagin Rovers to form Wagin in 1983.
Wagin Rovers			Matera Oval, Wagin	NFA		1959–1982	1	1980	Merged with Wagin Federals to form Wagin in 1983.
West Arthur		Bulldogs	Darkan Oval, Darkan	WFA		1959–2003	3	1962, 1964, 1976	Entered recess in 2004. Merged with Wagin to form Wagin Bulldogs in 2005.

== Grand final results ==
Year	Premiers	Score	Runners up	Score
1959	Towns	11.13 (79)	Imperials	7.13 (55)
1960	Towns	15.11 (101)	Wagin Federals	5.12 (42)
1961	Cuballing	14.11 (95)	Railways	9.14 (68)
1962	West Arthur	14.18 (102)	Cuballing	13.13 (91)
1963	Cuballing	14.26 (110)	Towns	8.6 (54)
1964	West Arthur	13.8 (86)	Towns	11.10 (76)
1965	Wickepin	19.20 (134)	Wagin Rovers	11.5 (71)
1966	Cuballing	10.10 (70)	Wickepin	9.9 (63)
1967	Wickepin	10.15 (75)	Cuballing	7.6 (48)
1968	Cuballing	12.15 (87)	Railways	11.8 (74)
1969	Cuballing	11.7 (73)	Railways	8.7 (55)
1970	Cuballing	13.19 (97)	Wickepin	8.9 (57)
1971	Cuballing	18.13 (121)	Williams	7.9 (51)
1972	Railways	12.14 (86)	Wickepin	12.12 (84)
1973	Cuballing	10.12 (72)	West Arthur	5.9 (39)
1974	Wickepin	10.9 (69)	Cuballing	6.11 (47)
1975	Wickepin	12.18 (90)	Wagin Rovers	11.11 (77)
1976	West Arthur	18.10 (118)	Wickepin	5.7 (37)
1977	Cuballing	15.11 (101)	Pingelly	14.12 (96)
1978	Railways	18.7 (115)	Pingelly	10.8 (68)
1979	Pingelly	15.26 (116)	Williams	10.15 (75)
1980	Wagin Rovers	15.12 (102)	Williams	12.10 (82)
1981	Wickepin	17.23 (125)	Williams	6.19 (55)
1982	Williams	20.15 (135)	Pingelly	13.13 (91)
1983	Williams	20.16 (136)	Wickepin	13.15 (93)
1984	Pingelly	23.14 (152)	Williams	13.8 (86)
1985	Wagin	6.21 (57)	Williams	6.8 (44)
1986	Towns	19.16 (130)	Williams	17.6 (108)
1987	Williams	18.8 (116)	Towns	14.12 (96)
1988	Towns	10.13 (73)	Williams	9.9 (63)
1989	Boddington	17.12 (114)	Wickepin	8.4 (52)
1990	Boddington	21.14 (140)	Lake Grace	12.9 (81)
1991	Boddington	20.12 (132)	Kukerin-Dumbleyung	14.11 (95)
1992	Kukerin-Dumbleyung	14.6 (90)	Boddington	5.16 (46)
1993	Kukerin-Dumbleyung	19.22 (136)	Boddington	8.13 (61)
1994	Wagin	12.10 (82)	Kukerin-Dumbleyung	10.16 (76)
1995	Boddington	14.16 (100)	Wagin	11.9 (75)
1996	Kukerin-Dumbleyung	19.18 (132)	Williams	12.7 (79)
1997	Williams	19.16 (130)	Boddington	2.14 (26)
1998	Kukerin-Dumbleyung	10.17 (77)	Wagin	8.16 (64)
1999	Wagin	13.9 (87)	Kukerin-Dumbleyung	6.13 (49)
2000	Wagin	14.8 (92)	Kukerin-Dumbleyung	12.15 (87)
2001	Kukerin-Dumbleyung	10.16 (76)	Wagin	10.10 (70)
2002	Boddington	11.10 (76)	Kukerin-Dumbleyung	7.7 (49)
2003	Brookton-Pingelly	8.3 (51)	Kukerin-Dumbleyung	6.9 (45)
2004	Wagin	14.9 (93)	Kukerin-Dumbleyung	10.10 (70)
2005	Kukerin-Dumbleyung	19.15 (129)	Narrogin Hawks	10.16 (76)
2006	Kukerin-Dumbleyung	19.10 (124)	Narrogin Hawks	18.14 (122)
2007	Wickepin	12.11 (83)	Kukerin-Dumbleyung	11.12 (78)
2008	Wickepin	15.5 (95)	Williams	12.15 (87)
2009	Williams	23.17 (155)	Wickepin	11.10 (76)
2010	Williams	8.15 (63)	Katanning Wanderers	7.6 (48)
2011	Williams	19.10 (124)	Boddington	9.14 (68)
2012	Boddington	8.11 (59)	Williams	7.9 (51)
2013	Williams	10.16 (76)	Boddington	8.12 (60)
2014	Williams	12.7 (79)	Narrogin Hawks	12.6 (78)
2015	Narrogin Hawks	16.14 (110)	Wickepin	13.11 (89)
2016	Williams	17.13 (115)	Kukerin-Dumbleyung	5.9 (39)
2017	Katanning Wanderers	17.14 (116)	Narrogin Hawks	11.7 (73)
2018	Boddington	13.13 (91)	Katanning Wanderers	12.11 (83)
2019	Boddington	14.14 (98)	Narrogin Hawks	11.12 (78)
2020	Williams	4.3 (27)	Wickepin	1.4 (10)
2021	Katanning Wanderers	12.7 (79)	Williams	11.9 (75)
2022	Boddington	8.8 (56)	Wickepin	8.7 (55)
2023	Katanning Wanderers	8.10 (58)	Williams	6.8 (44)
2024	Boddington	11.11 (77)	Wickepin	7.11 (53)
2025	Wickepin	11.9 (75)	Narrogin	7.8 (50)
2026	Narrogin	9.15 (69)	Wickepin	10.7 (67)

== Ladders ==
=== 2011 ladder ===
Upper Great Southern	Wins	Byes	Losses	Draws	For	Against	%	Pts	Final	Team	G	B	Pts	Team	G	B	Pts
Williams	16	0	0	0	2077	973	213.46%	64	1st semi	Kukerin/Dumbleyung	18	16	124	Katanning Wanderers	14	9	93
Boddington	12	0	4	0	1821	1114	163.46%	48	2nd semi	Williams	17	16	118	Boddington	10	9	69
Katanning Wanderers	11	0	5	0	1889	1423	132.75%	44	Preliminary	Boddington	21	8	134	Kukerin/Dumbleyung	16	11	107
Kukerin/Dumbleyung	10	0	6	0	1909	1387	137.64%	40	Grand	Williams	19	10	124	Boddington	9	14	68
Narrogin	6	0	10	0	1310	1690	77.51%	24									
Wagin	5	0	11	0	1145	1881	60.87%	20									
Wickepin	2	0	14	0	1101	1855	59.35%	8									
Brookton/Pingelly	2	0	14	0	1061	1990	53.32%	8									

=== 2012 ladder ===
Upper Great Southern	Wins	Byes	Losses	Draws	For	Against	%	Pts	Final	Team	G	B	Pts	Team	G	B	Pts
Williams	14	0	2	0	1875	1021	183.64%	56	1st semi	Boddington	17	15	117	Narrogin	10	6	66
Kukerin/Dumbleyung	11	0	5	0	1963	1318	148.94%	44	2nd semi	Williams	10	17	77	Kukerin/Dumbleyung	11	9	75
Boddington	11	0	5	0	1627	1235	131.74%	44	Preliminary	Boddington	26	6	162	Kukerin/Dumbleyung	7	9	51
Narrogin	8	0	7	1	1767	1442	122.54%	34	Grand	Boddington	8	11	59	Williams	7	9	51
Wickepin	7	0	9	0	1343	1546	86.87%	28									
Katanning Wanderers	6	0	10	0	1480	1847	80.13%	24									
Brookton/Pingelly	3	0	12	1	1177	1786	65.90%	14									
Wagin	3	0	13	0	1068	2105	50.74%	12									

=== 2013 ladder ===
Upper Great Southern	Wins	Byes	Losses	Draws	For	Against	%	Pts	Final	Team	G	B	Pts	Team	G	B	Pts
Williams	13	0	3	0	1860	905	205.52%	52	1st semi	Boddington	13	11	89	Kukerin/Dumbleyung	8	12	60
Narrogin	12	0	4	0	2017	991	203.53%	48	2nd semi	Williams	17	9	111	Narrogin	7	9	51
Boddington	11	0	5	0	1783	1124	158.63%	44	Preliminary	Boddington	14	7	91	Narrogin	10	9	69
Kukerin/Dumbleyung	10	0	6	0	1592	1170	136.07%	40	Grand	Williams	10	16	76	Boddington	8	12	60
Wickepin	8	0	8	0	1465	1538	95.25%	32									
Katanning Wanderers	7	0	9	0	1581	1584	99.81%	28									
Brookton/Pingelly	3	0	13	0	1001	1692	59.16%	12									
Wagin	0	0	16	0	513	2919	17.57%	0									

=== 2014 ladder ===
Upper Great Southern	Wins	Byes	Losses	Draws	For	Against	%	Pts	Final	Team	G	B	Pts	Team	G	B	Pts
Williams	13	0	1	0	1504	803	187.30%	52	1st semi	Wagin	12	13	85	Kukerin/Dumbleyung	9	12	66
Narrogin	12	0	2	0	1798	963	186.71%	48	2nd semi	Williams	19	13	127	Narrogin	13	15	93
Kukerin/Dumbleyung	9	0	5	0	1464	968	151.24%	36	Preliminary	Narrogin	18	15	123	Wagin	8	12	60
Wagin	7	0	7	0	1434	1158	123.83%	28	Grand	Williams	12	7	79	Narrogin	12	6	78
Wickepin	6	0	8	0	1187	1213	97.86%	24									
Katanning Wanderers	5	0	9	0	1348	1426	94.53%	20									
Brookton/Pingelly	4	0	10	0	1000	1375	72.73%	16									
Boddington	0	0	14	0	414	2243	18.46%	0									

=== 2015 ladder ===
Upper Great Southern	Wins	Byes	Losses	Draws	For	Against	%	Pts	Final	Team	G	B	Pts	Team	G	B	Pts
Narrogin	15	0	1	0	2362	1054	224.10%	60	1st semi	Boddington	17	18	120	Kukerin/Dumbleyung	15	5	95
Wickepin	13	0	3	0	1985	1080	183.80%	52	2nd semi	Wickepin	12	14	86	Narrogin	12	7	79
Kukerin/Dumbleyung	9	0	7	0	1740	1341	129.75%	36	Preliminary	Narrogin	18	20	128	Boddington	12	12	84
Boddington	9	0	7	0	1432	1366	104.83%	36	Grand	Narrogin	16	14	110	Wickepin	13	11	89
Williams	8	0	8	0	1531	1394	109.83%	32									
Wagin	6	0	10	0	1390	1574	88.31%	24									
Katanning Wanderers	4	0	12	0	1556	1729	89.99%	16									
Brookton/Pingelly	0	0	16	0	710	3168	22.41%	0									

=== 2016 ladder ===
Upper Great Southern	Wins	Byes	Losses	Draws	For	Against	%	Pts	Final	Team	G	B	Pts	Team	G	B	Pts
Williams	14	0	2	0	1930	976	197.75%	56	1st semi	Kukerin/Dumbleyung	13	16	94	Wickepin	9	18	72
Boddington	12	0	4	0	1648	1157	142.44%	48	2nd semi	Williams	14	9	93	Boddington	10	15	75
Wickepin	11	0	5	0	1692	1166	145.11%	44	Preliminary	Kukerin/Dumbleyung	15	10	100	Boddington	15	8	98
Kukerin/Dumbleyung	10	0	6	0	1811	1361	133.06%	40	Grand	Williams	17	13	115	Kukerin/Dumbleyung	5	9	39
Brookton/Pingelly	8	0	8	0	1688	1575	107.17%	32									
Katanning Wanderers	7	0	9	0	1442	1476	97.70%	28									
Narrogin	2	0	14	0	1244	1880	66.17%	8									
Wagin	0	0	16	0	705	2569	27.44%	0									

=== 2017 ladder ===
Upper Great Southern	Wins	Byes	Losses	Draws	For	Against	%	Pts	Final	Team	G	B	Pts	Team	G	B	Pts
Katanning Wanderers	13	0	3	0	2369	1049	225.83%	52	1st semi	Narrogin	19	19	133	Williams	5	13	43
Boddington	13	0	3	0	1597	1257	127.05%	52	2nd semi	Katanning Wanderers	17	15	117	Boddington	14	16	100
Narrogin	10	0	6	0	1985	1241	159.95%	40	Preliminary	Narrogin	18	15	123	Boddington	7	10	52
Williams	10	0	6	0	1838	1254	146.57%	40	Grand	Katanning Wanderers	17	14	116	Narrogin	11	7	73
Wickepin	10	0	6	0	1657	1183	140.07%	40									
Brookton/Pingelly	4	0	12	0	1120	2242	49.96%	16									
Kukerin/Dumbleyung	3	0	13	0	1040	1982	52.47%	12									
Wagin	1	0	15	0	900	2298	39.16%	4									

=== 2018 ladder ===
Upper Great Southern	Wins	Byes	Losses	Draws	For	Against	%	Pts	Final	Team	G	B	Pts	Team	G	B	Pts
Katanning Wanderers	14	0	0	0	2218	369	601.08%	56	1st semi	Williams	11	14	80	Narrogin	10	7	67
Boddington	11	0	3	0	1427	728	196.02%	44	2nd semi	Katanning Wanderers	18	12	120	Boddington	10	15	75
Williams	9	0	4	1	1523	880	173.07%	38	Preliminary	Boddington	18	19	127	Williams	8	8	56
Narrogin	8	0	6	0	1111	1117	94.39%	32	Grand	Boddington	13	13	91	Katanning Wanderers	12	11	83
Wickepin	6	0	7	1	1018	1009	100.89%	26									
Kukerin/Dumbleyung	3	0	11	0	775	1449	53.49%	12									
Brookton/Pingelly	3	0	11	0	480	1737	27.63%	12									
Wagin	1	0	13	0	506	1709	29.61%	4									

=== 2019 ladder ===
Upper Great Southern	Wins	Byes	Losses	Draws	For	Against	%	Pts	Final	Team	G	B	Pts	Team	G	B	Pts
Wickepin	12	0	2	0	1498	887	168.88%	48	1st semi	Narrogin	20	12	132	Brookton/Pingelly	10	21	81
Boddington	11	0	3	0	1385	884	156.67%	44	2nd semi	Boddington	9	11	65	Wickepin	7	11	47
Brookton/Pingelly	10	0	4	0	1242	840	147.86%	40	Preliminary	Narrogin	6	13	49	Wickepin	6	10	46
Narrogin	7	0	7	0	1329	1319	100.76%	28	Grand	Boddington	14	14	98	Narrogin	11	12	78
Katanning Wanderers	5	0	9	0	1015	1258	80.68%	20									
Wagin	4	0	10	0	849	1226	69.25%	16									
Williams	4	0	10	0	854	1265	67.51%	16									
Kukerin/Dumbleyung	3	0	11	0	812	1305	62.22%	12									

=== 2020 ladder ===
Upper Great Southern	Wins	Byes	Losses	Draws	For	Against	%	Pts	Final	Team	G	B	Pts	Team	G	B	Pts
Wickepin	7	0	0	0	804	284	283.10%	28	1st semi	Wickepin	8	14	62	Williams	8	12	60
Williams	5	0	2	0	516	441	117.01%	20	2nd semi	Narrogin	9	8	62	Boddington	3	7	25
Narrogin	4	0	3	0	499	446	111.88%	16	Preliminary	Williams	17	21	123	Narrogin	10	11	71
Wagin	4	0	3	0	439	499	87.98%	16	Grand	Williams	4	3	27	Wickepin	1	4	10
Boddington	3	0	4	0	658	448	146.88%	12									
Brookton/Pingelly	3	0	4	0	557	514	108.37%	12									
Kukerin/Dumbleyung	1	0	6	0	313	699	44.78%	4									
Katanning Wanderers	1	0	6	0	290	745	38.93%	4									

=== 2021 ladder ===
Upper Great Southern	Wins	Byes	Losses	Draws	For	Against	%	Pts	Final	Team	G	B	Pts	Team	G	B	Pts
Williams	11	0	2	0	1235	577	214.04%	44	1st semi	Kukerin/Dumbleyung	17	11	113	Brookton/Pingelly	11	5	71
Katanning	10	0	3	0	1026	608	168.75%	40	2nd semi	Williams	14	9	93	Katanning Wanderers	9	6	60
Kukerin/Dumbleyung	9	0	4	0	1006	740	135.95%	36	Preliminary	Katanning Wanderers	12	9	81	Kukerin/Dumbleyung	10	7	67
Brookton/Pingelly	9	0	9	0	1010	800	126.25%	36	Grand	Katanning Wanderers	12	7	79	Williams	11	9	75
Wickepin	4	0	9	0	834	1001	83.32%	16									
Boddington	4	0	9	0	882	1288	68.48%	16									
Wagin	4	0	9	0	699	1059	66.01%	16									
Narrogin	1	0	12	0	695	1314	52.89%	4									

=== 2022 ladder ===
Upper Great Southern	Wins	Byes	Losses	Draws	For	Against	%	Pts	Final	Team	G	B	Pts	Team	G	B	Pts
Wickepin	13	0	1	0	1284	739	173.75%	52	1st semi	Wickepin	12	9	81	Katanning Wanderers	6	5	41
Katanning Wanderers	11	0	3	0	1313	794	165.37%	44	2nd semi	Boddington	15	4	94	Kukerin/Dumbleyung	11	7	73
Kukerin/Dumbleyung	9	0	5	0	1113	1000	111.30%	36	Preliminary	Boddington	11	14	80	Katanning Wanderers	10	11	71
Boddington	8	0	8	0	940	960	97.92%	32	Grand	Boddington	8	8	56	Wickepin	8	7	55
Williams	5	0	8	1	1046	1056	99.05%	22									
Narrogin	4	0	9	1	931	1154	80.68%	18									
Brookton/Pingelly	3	0	11	0	1008	1150	87.65%	12									
Wagin	2	0	12	0	682	1464	46.58%	8									
