= Australs Football Club =

Australian rules football team

The Australs Football Club, the Lions is an Australian rules football team. Australs Football Club previously played in the Great Southern Football League before they were excluded in 2001. The Australs played home games at Kupara Park, located in the Great Southern town of Katanning.

== History ==
The Australs Football Club was formed when Katanning Imperials and Katanning Rovers merged in the lead up to Tambellup FA and Katanning FA merger. They played in the Central Great Southern Football League from its formation in 1960 until the year the CGSFL merged with the Southern Districts Football League at the end of 1990 and then played in the Great Southern Football League from 1991 until 2000.

The Australs Football Club won Central Great Southern Football League league premierships in 1970,1971,1972,1975 and 1978.

== Award winners ==
=== CGSFL League Fairest and Best Award ===
- 1965 M.Collins
- 1966 M.Collins
- 1971 M.McRae
- 1978 O.Loo
- 1980 G.Hall
- 1982 G.Hall
