= Lower South West Football League =

- Sport: Australian rules football
- Founded: 1959; 67 years ago
- No. of teams: 7
- Country: Australia
- Confederation: West Australian Country Football League
- Most recent champion: Kojonup (3) (2026)
- Most titles: Southerners (20)
- Website: lswfl.com.au

The Lower South West Football League is a country Australian rules football league incorporating teams from towns located within the South West and Great Southern regions of Western Australia.

== History ==
Australian Rules Football in the lower south west region of Western Australia has been played since the early part of the 20th century. For the first half of the century, the two major leagues that existed in the region were the Nelson Football Association and the Warren Football Association.

The Nelson Football Association included teams from the areas of Bridgetown, Greenbushes, Balingup, Nannup and Boyup Brook. The Warren Football Association was based in Manjimup and also included teams from the surrounding areas of Jardee, Pemberton, Northcliffe and Deanmill. Other smaller leagues such as the Bridgetown and Nannup Football Associations also existed, but only for short periods of time.

The Lower South West Football League was formed in 1959, as a result of a merger between the Nelson Football Association and the Warren Football Association. The merger of the two Associations was not easy with each league seeking to protect its interests and the clubs in each association were determined that they would not be overshadowed. After several meetings and lengthy discussions, the League was officially formed on 31 March 1959. The first league matches were scheduled for 26 April 1959, including reserves (B Grade) and colts (C Grade) matches.

Mr LW Gates, President of the Nelson Association prior to the merger, and one who played an important part in the merger, became the League's first President and Mr Joe Rowberry was elected vice president.

The inaugural teams included Boyup Brook, Bridgetown, Deanmill, Royals, Imperials, Tigers, Nannup and Southerners. Several of these inaugural clubs resulted from mergers. Bridgetown resulted from the merger of Warriors (maroon and yellow) and Rovers (red and blue), Tigers resulted from the merger of Jardee (green and gold) and Fire Brigades (blue and white), and Royals resulted from the merger of Greenbushes Centrals (blue and white) and Balingup (black and white). Southerners were formed by the amalgamation of Pemberton (red and blue) and Northcliffe (white and red), the two southernmost towns in the district, thus the naming Southerners.

Nannup only competed for one year and Royals competed for five years, before both teams left to join the Blackwood Football Association. The league remained as a six-team league for the next 44 years, when Kojonup joined the league in 2008 after transferring from the Great Southern Football League. Kojonup were previously known as the Magpies and wore black and white, but were required to change their colours and adopt a new logo (Cougars) to avoid a clash with Manjimup Imperials.

The only changes to the league since then have been the changes of logos for Boyup Brook and Deanmill. In 1987, Boyup Brook changed from being known as the Tigers to the Roos. This was also accompanied by a change in colours (to green and white). In 1997, Deanmill changed their nickname from The Mill to Hawks.

The official league colours were initially black and yellow, but have since changed to red, blue, green and yellow. The league has competed in numerous country carnivals, including the Mobil and Wesfarmers Country Carnivals (held in Perth) and the Great Southern Carnival.

== Clubs ==
=== Locations ===
Locations of the Lower South West FL clubs

=== Current ===
Club	Colours	Nickname	Home Ground	Former League	Est.	Years in LSWFL	LSWFL Premierships	
Club	Colours	Nickname	Home Ground	Former League	Est.	Years in LSWFL	Total	Years
Boyup Brook		Roos	Boyup Brook Oval, Boyup Brook	NFA		1959–	4	1981, 2012, 2022, 2024
Bridgetown		Bulldogs	Bridgetown Greater Sports Ground, Bridgetown	–	1959	1959–	5	1984, 1986, 2003, 2019, 2021
Deanmill		Hawks	Deanmill Oval, Deanmill	WFA	1920	1959–	18	1963, 1966, 1968, 1970, 1972, 1973, 1974, 1980, 1987, 1990, 1991, 1994, 1997, 2002, 2008, 2009, 2015, 2025
Imperials		Magpies	Manjimup Recreation Oval, Manjimup	WFA	1930	1959–	9	1961, 1982, 1983, 1989, 1993, 1998, 2004, 2007, 2018
Kojonup		Cougars	Kojonup Oval, Kojonup	GSFL	1923	2008–	3	2014, 2023, 2026
Manjimup		Tigers	Rea Park, Manjimup	–	1959	1959–	8	1959, 1960, 1962, 1977, 1978, 1996, 2010, 2013
Southerners		Souths	Pemberton Oval, Pemberton	–	1959	1959–	20	1964, 1965, 1967, 1969, 1971, 1975, 1976, 1979, 1985, 1988, 1992, 1995, 2000, 2001, 2005, 2006, 2011, 2016, 2017

=== Former ===
Club	Colours	Nickname	Home Ground	Former League	Est.	Years in LSWFL	LSWFL Premierships		Notes
Club	Colours	Nickname	Home Ground	Former League	Est.	Years in LSWFL	Total	Years	Notes
Greenbushes		Royals	Greenbushes Oval, Greenbushes	–	1959	1959–1963	0	-	De-merged into Centrals and Balingup, who, along with Kirup, formed the Central District FA in 1964
Nannup		Redlegs	Nannup Oval, Nannup	NFA		1959	0	-	Played socially from 1960-1962, joined the Augusta-Margaret River NFA in 1963.

== Grand final results ==
Year	League	Reserves	Colts
1959	Tigers 13.17 (95) d Deanmill 13.4 (82)	Tigers 8.6 (54) d Bridgetown 6.13 (49)	Deanmill 2.4 (16) d Southerners 1.7 (13)
1960	Tigers 11.7 (73) d Bridgetown 4.9 (33)	Southerners 6.8 (44) d Tigers 3.12 (30)	Deanmill 4.5 (29) d Imperials 3.3 (21)
1961	Imperials 6.14 (50) d Deanmill 7.7 (49)	Imperials 14.10 (94) d Tigers 10.5 (65)	Deanmill 9.12 (66) d Bridgetown 3.8 (26)
1962	Tigers 11.20 (86) d Southerners 7.8 (50)	Deanmill 6.18 (54) d Tigers 7.10 (52)	Imperials 15.13 (103) d Bridgetown 4.6 (30)
1963	Deanmill 10.13 (73) d Tigers 6.9 (45)	Deanmill 8.12 (60) d Tigers 4.5 (29)	Bridgetown 6.5 (41) d Imperials 5.6 (36)
1964	Southerners 7.7 (49) d Deanmill 6.11 (47)	Tigers 10.11 (71) d Southerners 5.4 (34)	Imperials 7.5 (47) d Bridgetown 6.6 (42)
1965	Southerners 8.11 (59) d Bridgetown 7.11 (53)	Deanmill 8.6 (54) d Bridgetown 6.11 (47)	Imperials 7.11 (53) d Tigers 6.3 (39)
1966	Deanmill 11.15 (81) d Bridgetown 11.3 (69)	Southerners 10.8 (68) d Imperials 7.13 (55)	Imperials 2.10 (22) d Tigers 2.8 (20)
1967	Southerners 15.11 (101) d Bridgetown 8.16 (64)	Southerners 15.11 (101) d Bridgetown 8.16 (64)	Imperials d Tigers (scores unknown)
1968	Deanmill 8.16 (64) d Imperials 4.13 (37)	Deanmill 6.8 (44) d Southerners 5.11 (41)	Tigers 13.17 (95) d Deanmill 3.4 (22)
1969	Southerners 16.19 (115) d Deanmill 7.4 (46)	Southerners 9.11 (65) d Tigers 7.15 (57)	Tigers 11.12 (78) d Bridgetown 4.9 (33)
1970	Deanmill 8.6 (54) d Southerners 6.10 (46)	Imperials 7.5 (47) d Deanmill 3.8 (26)	Tigers 6.6 (42) d Imperials 1.8 (14)
1971	Southerners 7.14 (56) d Tigers 6.6 (42)	Bridgetown 5.5 (35) d Tigers 3.10 (28)	Tigers 4.4 (28) d Imperials 3.5 (23)
1972	Deanmill 17.10 (112) d Bridgetown 9.5 (59)	Tigers 6.13 (49) d Deanmill 5.17 (47)	Southerners 10.16 (76) d Tigers 4.1 (25)
1973	Deanmill 7.12 (54) d Southerners 7.5 (47)	Southerners 11.6 (72) d Imperials 8.10 (58)	Southerners 9.8 (62) d Imperials 3.5 (23)
1974	Deanmill 17.4 (106) d Southerners 16.4 (100)	Southerners 11.8 (74) d Boyup Brook 6.13 (49)	Tigers 15.16 (106) d Bridgetown 12.5 (77)
1975	Southerners 15.13 (103) d Imperials 9.22 (76)	Deanmill 7.9 (51) d Southerners 6.5 (41)	Southerners 11.9 (75) d Tigers 6.8 (44)
1976	Southerners 16.8 (104) d Imperials 8.20 (68)	Boyup Brook 14.10 (94) d Tigers 10.8 (68)	Tigers 9.9 (63) d Southerners 7.9 (51)
1977	Tigers 10.5 (65) d Deanmill 6.15 (51)	Southerners 16.18 (114) d Tigers 10.9 (69)	Imperials 5.10 (40) d Southerners 5.7 (37)
1978	Tigers 16.18 (114) d Deanmill 16.10 (106)	Deanmill 14.12 (96) d Southerners 9.7 (61)	Southerners 17.8 (110) d Bridgetown 6.9 (45)
1979	Southerners 18.8 (116) d Bridgetown 7.12 (54)	Deanmill 11.17 (83) d Southerners 11.7 (73)	Imperials 12.10 (82) d Southerners 7.4 (46)
1980	Deanmill 25.15 (165) d Southerners 12.9 (81)	Bridgetown 15.12 (102) d Southerners 10.8 (68)	Deanmill 9.12 (66) d Bridgetown 8.5 (53)
1981	Boyup Brook 24.28 (172) d Southerners 4.16 (40)	Southerners 16.17 (113) d Boyup Brook 14.8 (92)	Bridgetown 15.4 (94) d Imperials 9.11 (65)
1982	Imperials 19.13 (127) d Boyup Brook 12.11 (83)	Imperials 11.5 (71) d Southerners 7.10 (52)	Bridgetown 14.14 (98) d Southerners 9.13 (67)
1983	Imperials 12.18 (90) d Deanmill 5.13 (43)	Bridgetown 7.9 (51) d Southerners 6.8 (44)	Tigers 14.10 (94) d Deanmill 13.9 (87)
1984	Bridgetown 14.14 (98) d Imperials 9.16 (70)	Southerners 14.13 (97) d Deanmill 11.6 (72)	Deanmill 21.12 (138) d Imperials 8.10 (58)
1985	Southerners 14.13 (97) d Bridgetown 10.5 (65)	Southerners 16.11 (107) d Deanmill 15.6 (96)	Tigers 16.19 (115) d Southerners 7.4 (46)
1986	Bridgetown 13.11 (89) d Southerners 9.11 (65)	Southerners 10.9 (69) d Deanmill 7.12 (54)	Imperials 7.12 (54) d Southerners 4.6 (30)
1987	Deanmill 18.14 (122) d Southerners 13.15 (93)	Southerners 16.16 (112) d Deanmill 12.13 (85)	Imperials 15.15 (105) d Deanmill 11.12 (78)
1988	Southerners 16.15 (111) d Deanmill 9.7 (61)	Southerners 16.7 (103) d Imperials 8.6 (54)	Imperials 13.7 (85) d Southerners 3.4 (22)
1989	Imperials 16.6 (102) d Boyup Brook 9.15 (69)	Imperials 13.15 (93) d Bridgetown 1.2 (8)	Tigers 13.15 (93) d Deanmill 3.5 (23)
1990	Deanmill 15.10 (100) d Southerners 9.12 (66)	Imperials 11.13 (79) d Deanmill 9.10 (64)	Southerners 9.8 (62) d Tigers 7.8 (50)
1991	Deanmill 5.10 (40) d Tigers 3.5 (23)	Tigers 10.7 (67) d Imperials 4.10 (34)	Southerners 10.7 (67) d Deanmill 5.4 (34)
1992	Southerners 5.14 (44) d Imperials 5.9 (39)	Imperials 12.7 (79) d Deanmill 11.8 (74)	Southerners 8.8 (56) d Tigers 3.4 (22)
1993	Imperials 23.17 (155) d Deanmill 8.6 (54)	Southerners 11.15 (81) d Deanmill 6.13 (49)	Tigers 7.3 (45) d Southerners 6.8 (44)
1994	Deanmill 13.12 (90) d Southerners 9.12 (66)	Southerners 11.13 (79) d Boyup Brook 5.4 (34)	Southerners 6.18 (54) d Imperials 4.10 (34)
1995	Southerners 17.13 (115) d Tigers 6.5 (41)	Southerners 14.6 (90) d Imperials 3.13 (31)	Southerners 9.12 (66) d Imperials 1.2 (8)
1996	Tigers 7.13 (55) d Deanmill 2.5 (17)	Imperials 7.6 (48) d Deanmill 5.9 (39)	Southerners 13.6 (84) d Bridgetown 1.2 (8)
1997	Deanmill 13.17 (95) d Southerners 8.7 (55)	Imperials 10.10 (70) d Southerners 5.8 (38)	Southerners 7.8 (50) d Imperials 7.5 (47)
1998	Imperials 17.16 (118) d Southerners 1.3 (9)	Imperials 8.7 (55) d Southerners 7.6 (48)	Imperials 10.11 (71) d Tigers 3.5 (23)
1999	Southerners 9.10 (64) d Boyup Brook 8.10 (58)	Southerners 14.8 (92) d Boyup Brook 13.7 (85)	Southerners 7.13 (55) d Bridgetown 4.8 (32)
2000	Southerners 13.8 (86) d Boyup Brook 11.8 (74)	Tigers 15.8 (98) d Boyup Brook 9.10 (64)	Imperials 8.6 (54) d Bridgetown 7.3 (45)
2001	Southerners 12.7 (79) d Deanmill 6.8 (44)	Bridgetown 12.7 (79) d Southerners 4.3 (27)	Southerners 5.8 (38) d Tigers 4.5 (29)
2002	Deanmill 9.15 (69) d Boyup Brook 6.9 (45)	Southerners 8.5 (53) d Imperials 5.13 (43)	Southerners 7.12 (54) d Tigers 0.9 (9)
2003	Bridgetown 11.10 (76) d Southerners 6.10 (46)	Southerners 13.12 (90) d Deanmill 7.9 (51)	Southerners 7.9 (51) d Deanmill 5.3 (33)
2004	Imperials 14.9 (93) d Bridgetown 11.8 (74)	Boyup Brook 12.5 (77) d Southerners 3.13 (31)	Deanmill 15.8 (98) d Bridgetown 3.6 (24)
2005	Southerners 13.10 (88) d Bridgetown 9.8 (62)	Southerners 12.9 (81) d Deanmill 7.11 (53)	Tigers 8.12 (60) d Deanmill 7.7 (49)
2006	Southerners 8.8 (56) drew Tigers 9.2 (56); Southerners 17.13 (115) d Tigers 8.4 (52)	Deanmill 14.6 (90) d Boyup Brook 7.6 (48)	Tigers 11.7 (73) d Deanmill 9.7 (61)
2007	Imperials 9.13 (67) d Deanmill 8.10 (58)	Southerners 11.10 (76) d Boyup Brook 3.3 (21)	Deanmill 9.11 (65) d Southerners 5.10 (40)
2008	Deanmill 25.21 (171) d Imperials 9.11 (65)	Tigers 7.12 (54) d Bridgetown 5.5 (35)	Southerners 8.13 (61) d Deanmill 2.6 (18)
2009	Deanmill 14.10 (94) d Imperials 8.7 (55)	Bridgetown 5.9 (39) d Kojonup 1.2 (8)	Deanmill 6.11 (47) d Tigers 6.8 (44)
2010	Tigers 21.12 (138) d Deanmill 13.9 (87)	Southerners 11.13 (79) d Kojonup 6.7 (43)	Southerners 12.11 (83) d Imperials 8.2 (50)
2011	Southerners 14.11 (95) d Tigers 11.5 (71)	Southerners 9.10 (64) d Deanmill 5.8 (38)	Deanmill 13.7 (85) d Kojonup 7.3 (45)
2012	Boyup Brook 14.18 (102) d Deanmill 10.17 (77)	Southerners 14.9 (93) d Boyup Brook 6.11 (47)	Southerners 9.13 (67) d Kojonup 9.10 (64)
2013	Tigers 15.13 (103) d Southerners 10.12 (72)	Kojonup 9.11 (65) d Deanmill 6.10 (46)	Deanmill 7.8 (50) d Bridgetown 4.12 (36)
2014	Kojonup 21.17 (143) d Tigers 10.11 (71)	Deanmill 9.14 (68) d Bridgetown 5.1 (31)	Deanmill 12.12 (84) d Imperials 4.16 (40)
2015	Deanmill 6.9 (45) d Southerners 4.8 (32)	Bridgetown 5.7 (37) d Deanmill 5.2 (32)	Imperials 7.5 (47) d Deanmill 5.7 (37)
2016	Southerners 14.15 (99) d Imperials 7.7 (49)	Deanmill 10.10 (70) d Southerners 4.8 (32)	Deanmill 9.10 (64) d Imperials 7.5 (47)
2017	Southerners 14.10 (94) d Imperials 9.11 (65)	Southerners 10.11 (71) d Imperials 5.2 (32)	Deanmill 19.7 (121) d Tigers 4.11 (35)
2018	Imperials 14.6 (90) d Deanmill 12.16 (88)	Imperials 14.6 (90) d Deanmill 10.5 (65)	Southerners 11.10 (76) d Bridgetown 3.7 (25)
2019	Bridgetown 11.14 (80) d Deanmill 9.7 (61)	Bridgetown 12.9 (81) d Deanmill 7.6 (48)	Imperials 10.11 (71) d Tigers 7.9 (51)
2021	Bridgetown 12.10 (82) d Boyup Brook 9.9 (63)	Bridgetown 7.6 (48) d Deanmill 3.8 (26)	Imperials 7.11 (53) d Deanmill 8.3 (51)
2022	Boyup Brook 18.9 (117) d Deanmill 13.9 (87)	Southerners 9.7 (61) d Deanmill 3.2 (20)	Tigers 8.8 (56) d Bridgetown 5.7 (37)
2023	Kojonup 15.11 (101) d Bridgetown 14.8 (92)	Bridgetown 7.8 (50) d Imperials 5.6 (36)	Tigers 16.9 (105) d Bridgetown 7.3 (45)
2024	Boyup Brook 18.10 (118) d Kojonup 15.11 (101)	Deanmill 20.12 (132) d Kojonup 5.3 (33)	Tigers 11.8 (74) d Southerners 3.3 (21)
2025	Deanmill 15.14 (104) d Southerners 10.6 (66)	Deanmill 9.9 (63) d Bridgetown 3.5 (23)	Southerners 9.3 (57) d Deanmill 4.13 (37)
2026	Kojonup 19.15 (129) d Bridgetown 6.9 (45)	Bridgetown 11.11 (77) d Deanmill 4.8 (32)	Southerners 9.10 (64) d Deanmill 8.4 (52)

== Club information ==
Boyup Brook - Competed in the Nelson Football Association from 1938 to 1958. They were originally known as the Boyup Brook Tigers wearing yellow and black, but changed their nickname to the Roos and their colours to green and white in 1987.

Bridgetown - A single Bridgetown Football Club had existed since 1904 in the Nelson Football Association wearing blue and red, until the club split in the 1920s into the two clubs, Rovers and Warriors. The Bridgetown Rovers (blue and red) and Bridgetown Warriors (maroon and yellow) both competed in the Nelson Football Association from 1921 to 1958. The two clubs merged prior to the commencement of the LSWFL in 1959 to form the Bridgetown Bulldogs.

Deanmill - Founded in 1920 as No 1 Mill, changed to Deanmill in 1937. Deanmill later adopted the Hawks logo in 1997.

Imperials - The earliest records available indicate that a Manjimup Football Club first played as a team in 1917. The Manjimup Imperials Football Club first came into being in 1930 following the disbanding of the Manjimup Football Club, though the history of both are considered part of the club as it is now known.

Kojonup - Moved to the LSWFL from the Great Southern FL in 2008, also changing their name and colours from the Kojonup Magpies, wearing black and white, due to Manjimup Imperials already possessing both the logo and colours. Kojonup originally came from the now defunct Central Great Southern FL before it was merged with the Southern Districts FL in 1990 to become the Great Southern FL. Kojonup won 10 premierships in the Central Great Southern FL (in 1961, 1964–65, 1969, 1973–74, 1976, 1979, 1981 and 1988) and one premiership in the Great Southern FL (in 1997). Kojonup won their first League premiership in the LSWFL in 2014.

Tigers - Prior to the commencement of the LSWFL in 1959, Jardee FC (green and yellow) and Fire Brigades FC (blue and white) merged to become the Tigers FC. At the start of the LSWFL Tigers were the most successful club, winning three of the first four league premierships (1959,1960 & 1962).

Southerners - Originally Pemberton Warriors and Pemberton Jayes merged to become Pemberton FC. Prior to the commencement of the LSWFL in 1959 Pemberton FC and Northcliffe FC merged to become Southerners FC.

Royals - Founding club from the Nelson FA. Played 5 years in the LSWFL before later forming the Central Districts FA with Kirup FC, Nannup FC and Balingup FC. The Central Districts FA was later renamed the Blackwood FA sometime in the 1970s. Now defunct.

Nannup - Founding club from the Nelson FA. Played only one year in the LSWFL before later forming the Blackwood DFA (a.k.a. Central Districts FA) with Kirup FC, Greenbushes FC and Balingup FC. The league folded in the mid-1970s and Nannup went into recess. Re-formed in 1993 and joined the Onshore Cup competition.

== Records ==
The following records are current to the end of the 2024 season.

Category	Record	Information
Game Scores		
Highest Score	323 points	Tigers 48.35 (323) vs Royals 1.5 (11), 12 May 1963
Lowest Score	1 point	Royals 0.1 (1) vs Deanmill 27.28 (190), 29 July 1962; Royals 0.1 (1) vs Bridgetown 18.23 (131), 4 August 1963; Royals 0.1 (1) vs Imperials 43.20 (278), 25 August 1963
Greatest Winning Margin	312 points	Tigers 48.35 (323) vs Royals 1.5 (11), 12 May 1963
Highest Losing Score	154 points	Imperials 23.16 (154) vs Southerners 28.23 (191), 27 June 1976
Lowest Winning Score	18 points	Deanmill 2.6 (18) vs Bridgetown 0.8 (8), 14 July 1968
Highest Aggregate Score	345 points	Southerners 28.23 (191) vs Imperials 23.16 (154), 27 June 1976
Lowest Aggregate Score	26 points	Deanmill 2.6 (18) vs Bridgetown 0.8 (8), 14 July 1968
Highest Aggregate of Goals	51 goals	Southerners 28.23 (191) vs Imperials 23.16 (154), 27 June 1976; Tigers 29.17 (191) vs Boyup Brook 22.7 (139), 22 June 1980
Highest Aggregate of Behinds	48 behinds	Boyup Brook 11.32 (98) vs Royals 9.16 (70), 25 July 1961
Lowest Aggregate of Goals	2 goals	Deanmill 2.6 (18) vs Bridgetown 0.8 (8), 14 July 1968
Lowest Aggregate of Behinds	5 behinds	Deanmill 8.1 (49) vs Imperials 5.4 (34), 26 July 1964; Bridgetown 7.2 (44) vs Southerners 3.3 (21), 18 July 1999; Southerners 6.3 (39) vs Bridgetown 2.2 (14), 1 July 2007
Ladders		
Greatest Rise in Consecutive Seasons	6 places	Tigers, Last (7th) 2012 to Premiers 2013
Greatest Fall in Consecutive Seasons	5 places	Bridgetown, Premiers 1986 to Last (6th) 1987; Southerners, Premiers 2011 to 6th 2012; Boyup Brook, Premiers 2012 to 6th 2013
Finals		
Most Consecutive Finals	23 years	Southerners, 1985 to 2007
Most Consecutive Grand Finals	5 years	Southerners, 1997 to 2001
Most Consecutive Premierships	3 years	Deanmill, 1972 to 1974; Southerners, 1999 to 2001
Longest Finals Drought	10 years	Bridgetown, 1987 to 1996
Longest Grand Final Drought	22 years	Boyup Brook, 1959 to 1980
Longest Premiership Drought	31 years	Boyup Brook, 1981 to 2012
Most Times as Opponents in Finals	39 times	Deanmill vs Southerners
Most Times as Opponents in Grand Finals	13 times	Deanmill vs Southerners
Premierships In All Three Grades	3 times	Southerners, 1995; Imperials, 1998; Southerners, 1999
Season Scores		
Highest % in a Season (excluding Finals)	324.8%	Southerners, 2017 (14 games)
Lowest % in a Season	12.3%	Royals, 1963 (16 games)
Highest Average Score in a Season (excluding Finals)	129.3 points	Tigers, 2013 (16 games)
Lowest Average Score in a Season	21.0 points	Royals, 1963 (16 games)
Highest % of Wins in a Season (excluding Finals)	94%	Southerners, 2005 (17 wins from 18 games)
Lowest % of Wins in a Season	0%	Boyup Brook, 1964, 1965, 1971, 1993, 1996, 2016; Bridgetown, 1987, 1990, 1991, 2007, 2015; Royals, 1963; Kojonup, 2008; Imperials, 2014
Highest % of Wins to Miss Finals	59%	Imperials, 1960 (8 wins 3 draws from 16 games)
Lowest % of Wins to Reach Finals	27%	Boyup Brook, 1988 (4 wins from 15 games)
Wins and Losses		
Most Consecutive Wins	16 wins	Boyup Brook, 2000 Round 3 to 2000 2nd Semi Final; Southerners, 2005 Round 5 to 2005 Grand Final
Most Consecutive Losses	38 losses	Bridgetown, 1989 Round 13 to 1992 Round 3
Goals		
Most Goals in a Game (by a player)	29 goals 23 goals	David Sewell, Imperials vs Royals, 25 August 1963 /Barry Jackson, Tigers vs Royals, 12 May 1963
Most Goals in a Season (by a player)	107 goals	Patrick Farrant, Bridgetown, 2023

== Ladders ==
2002

Lower South West	Wins	Byes	Losses	Draws	For	Against	%	Pts	Final	Team	G	B	Pts	Team	G	B	Pts
Deanmill	13	0	3	1	1614	1004	160.76%	54	1st semi	Boyup Brook	15	11	101	Bridgetown	12	11	83
Southerners	13	0	4	0	1139	1010	112.77%	52	2nd semi	Deanmill	12	5	77	Southerners	4	9	33
Boyup Brook	9	0	8	0	1371	1371	100.00%	36	Preliminary	Boyup Brook	10	4	64	Southerners	5	9	39
Bridgetown	8	0	9	0	1401	1367	102.49%	32	Grand	Deanmill	9	15	69	Boyup Brook	6	9	45
Tigers	4	0	12	1	1265	1455	86.94%	18									
Manjimup Imperials	3	0	14	0	985	1568	62.82%	12									

2003

Lower South West	Wins	Byes	Losses	Draws	For	Against	%	Pts	Final	Team	G	B	Pts	Team	G	B	Pts
Southerners	16	0	1	0	1652	766	215.67%	64	1st semi	Deanmill	19	13	127	Manjimup Imperials	12	9	81
Bridgetown	14	0	3	0	1597	838	190.57%	56	2nd semi	Southerners	14	8	92	Bridgetown	12	6	78
Deanmill	8	0	9	0	1322	1317	100.38%	32	Preliminary	Bridgetown	9	15	69	Deanmill	6	5	41
Manjimup Imperials	7	0	10	0	1266	1507	84.01%	28	Grand	Bridgetown	11	10	76	Southerners	6	10	46
Tigers	5	0	12	0	1049	1499	69.98%	20									
Boyup Brook	1	0	16	0	842	1801	46.75%	4									

2004

Lower South West	Wins	Byes	Losses	Draws	For	Against	%	Pts	Final	Team	G	B	Pts	Team	G	B	Pts
Bridgetown	12	0	3	0	1344	668	201.20%	48	1st semi	Manjimup Imperials	6	14	50	Southerners	7	5	47
Tigers	11	0	4	0	1237	1014	121.99%	44	2nd semi	Bridgetown	14	8	92	Tigers	11	10	76
Southerners	9	0	6	0	994	872	113.99%	36	Preliminary	Manjimup Imperials	11	20	86	Tigers	6	8	44
Manjimup Imperials	7	0	8	0	1036	1118	92.67%	28	Grand	Manjimup Imperials	14	9	93	Bridgetown	11	8	74
Boyup Brook	3	0	12	0	824	1288	63.98%	12									
Deanmill	3	0	12	0	740	1215	60.91%	12									

2005

Lower South West	Wins	Byes	Losses	Draws	For	Against	%	Pts	Final	Team	G	B	Pts	Team	G	B	Pts
Southerners	17	0	1	0	1776	952	186.55%	68	1st semi	Bridgetown	22	24	156	Manjimup Imperials	7	6	48
Tigers	13	0	5	0	1981	1054	187.95%	52	2nd semi	Southerners	15	9	99	Tigers	8	5	53
Bridgetown	9	0	8	1	1640	1314	124.81%	38	Preliminary	Bridgetown	9	8	62	Tigers	5	12	42
Manjimup Imperials	7	0	11	0	1127	1704	66.14%	28	Grand	Southerners	13	10	88	Bridgetown	9	8	62
Boyup Brook	5	0	12	1	1102	1839	59.92%	22									
Deanmill	2	0	16	0	1015	1778	57.09%	8									

2006

Lower South West	Wins	Byes	Losses	Draws	For	Against	%	Pts	Final	Team	G	B	Pts	Team	G	B	Pts
Tigers	15	0	2	0	2031	873	232.65%	60	1st semi	Bridgetown	12	12	84	Boyup Brook	16	9	105
Southerners	13	0	4	0	1808	847	213.46%	52	2nd semi	Southerners	15	9	99	Tigers	12	6	78
Bridgetown	10	0	7	0	1690	1329	127.16%	40	Preliminary	Tigers	21	20	146	Boyup Brook	4	12	36
Boyup Brook	6	0	11	0	1441	1553	92.79%	24	Grand	Southerners	8	8	56	Tigers	9	2	56
Deanmill	6	0	11	0	1248	1750	71.31%	24									
Manjimup Imperials	1	0	16	0	767	2633	29.13%	4									

2007

Lower South West	Wins	Byes	Losses	Draws	For	Against	%	Pts	Final	Team	G	B	Pts	Team	G	B	Pts
Deanmill	13	0	2	0	1574	936	168.16%	52	1st semi	Tigers	7	12	54	Southerners	4	6	30
Manjimup Imperials	12	0	3	0	1550	1026	151.07%	48	2nd semi	Deanmill	19	10	124	Manjimup Imperials	17	9	111
Tigers	11	0	4	0	1357	945	143.60%	44	Preliminary	Manjimup Imperials	18	11	119	Tigers	13	11	89
Southerners	5	0	10	0	985	1194	82.50%	20	Grand	Imperials	9	13	67	Deanmill	8	10	58
Boyup Brook	4	0	11	0	1198	1220	98.20%	16									
Bridgetown	0	0	15	0	475	1818	26.13%	0									

2008

Lower South West	Wins	Byes	Losses	Draws	For	Against	%	Pts	Final	Team	G	B	Pts	Team	G	B	Pts
Deanmill	11	0	3	0	1842	892	206.50%	44	1st semi	Boyup Brook	26	10	166	Bridgetown	11	10	76
Manjimup Imperials	11	0	3	0	1683	1252	134.42%	44	2nd semi	Deanmill	22	14	146	Manjimup Imperials	13	11	89
Boyup Brook	10	0	4	0	1355	929	145.86%	40	Preliminary	Manjimup Imperials	18	12	120	Boyup Brook	11	7	73
Bridgetown	8	0	6	0	1543	1419	108.74%	32	Grand	Deanmill	25	11	161	Manjimup Imperials	9	11	65
Tigers	6	0	8	0	1416	1225	115.59%	24									
Southerners	3	0	11	0	774	1713	45.18%	12									
Kojonup	0	0	14	0	836	2019	41.41%	0									

2009

Lower South West	Wins	Byes	Losses	Draws	For	Against	%	Pts	Final	Team	G	B	Pts	Team	G	B	Pts
Deanmill	12	0	2	0	1743	942	185.03%	48	1st semi	Boyup Brook	10	11	71	Kojonup	10	10	70
Manjimup Imperials	11	0	3	0	1788	1089	164.19%	44	2nd semi	Imperials	19	6	120	Deanmill	17	11	113
Boyup Brook	8	0	6	0	1347	1226	109.87%	32	Preliminary	Deanmill	14	17	101	Boyup Brook	10	11	71
Kojonup	8	0	6	0	1364	1344	101.49%	32	Grand	Deanmill	14	10	94	Imperials	8	7	55
Tigers	6	0	8	0	1486	1192	124.66%	24									
Southerners	3	0	11	0	1063	1503	70.73%	12									
Bridgetown	1	0	13	0	847	2342	36.17%	4									

2010

Lower South West	Wins	Byes	Losses	Draws	For	Against	%	Pts	Final	Team	G	B	Pts	Team	G	B	Pts
Deanmill	12	0	2	0	1648	1052	156.65%	48	1st semi	Tigers	17	10	112	Southerners	12	10	82
Manjimup Imperials	10	0	4	0	1568	1094	143.33%	40	2nd semi	Deanmill	17	15	117	Imperials	9	9	63
Tigers	9	0	5	0	1611	1021	157.79%	36	Preliminary	Tigers	17	18	120	Imperials	15	10	100
Southerners	8	0	6	0	1160	1056	109.85%	32	Grand	Tigers	21	12	138	Deanmill	13	9	87
Kojonup	6	0	8	0	1424	1249	114.01%	24									
Boyup Brook	3	0	11	0	820	1637	50.09%	12									
Bridgetown	1	0	13	0	644	1766	36.47%	4									

2011

Lower South West	Wins	Byes	Losses	Draws	For	Against	%	Pts	Final	Team	G	B	Pts	Team	G	B	Pts
Boyup Brook	12	0	2	0	1696	801	211.74%	48	1st semi	Tigers	21	5	131	Imperials	18	14	122
Southerners	12	0	2	0	1521	725	209.79%	48	2nd semi	Southerners	13	12	90	Boyup Brook	9	15	69
Tigers	8	0	6	0	1253	1104	113.50%	32	Preliminary	Tigers	14	13	97	Boyup Brook	12	15	87
Manjimup Imperials	8	0	6	0	1494	1182	126.40%	32	Grand	Southerners	14	11	95	Tigers	11	5	71
Deanmill	6	0	8	0	1215	1219	99.67%	24									
Kojonup	2	0	12	0	718	1963	36.58%	8									
Bridgetown	1	0	13	0	760	1663	45.70%	4									

2012

Lower South West	Wins	Byes	Losses	Draws	For	Against	%	Pts	Final	Team	G	B	Pts	Team	G	B	Pts
Deanmill	12	0	2	0	1574	1013	155.38%	48	1st semi	Imperials	18	11	119	Kojonup	17	9	111
Boyup Brook	11	0	3	0	1607	939	171.14%	44	2nd semi	Boyup Brook	21	13	139	Deanmill	8	16	64
Manjimup Imperials	9	0	5	0	1496	1121	133.45%	36	Preliminary	Deanmill	13	11	89	Imperials	10	12	72
Kojonup	6	0	8	0	1420	1525	93.11%	24	Grand	Boyup Brook	14	18	102	Deanmill	10	17	77
Bridgetown	6	0	8	0	1092	1300	84.00%	24									
Southerners	4	0	10	0	1040	1403	74.13%	16									
Tigers	1	0	13	0	1010	1938	52.12%	4									

2013

Lower South West	Wins	Byes	Losses	Draws	For	Against	%	Pts	Final	Team	G	B	Pts	Team	G	B	Pts
Tigers	13	0	3	0	2069	1287	160.76%	52	1st semi	Kojonup	8	15	63	Deanmill	7	13	55
Southerners	12	0	4	0	1923	1018	188.90%	48	2nd semi	Southerners	12	9	81	Tigers	8	12	60
Deanmill	10	0	6	0	1394	1137	122.60%	40	Preliminary	Tigers	14	18	102	Kojonup	14	17	101
Kojonup	9	0	7	0	1743	1511	115.35%	36	Grand	Tigers	15	13	103	Southerners	10	12	72
Manjimup Imperials	5	0	10	1	1106	1653	66.91%	22									
Boyup Brook	5	0	11	0	1357	1898	71.50%	20									
Bridgetown	1	0	14	1	896	1984	45.16%	6									

2014

Lower South West	Wins	Byes	Losses	Draws	For	Against	%	Pts	Final	Team	G	B	Pts	Team	G	B	Pts
Tigers	11	0	3	0	1645	758	217.02%	44	1st semi	Kojonup	12	20	92	Southerners	8	16	64
Deanmill	11	0	3	0	1628	776	209.79%	44	2nd semi	Tigers	19	11	125	Deanmill	9	8	62
Kojonup	11	0	3	0	1739	844	206.04%	44	Preliminary	Kojonup	24	11	155	Deanmill	7	9	51
Southerners	9	0	5	0	1305	1106	117.99%	36	Grand	Kojonup	21	17	143	Tigers	10	11	71
Boyup Brook	4	0	10	0	918	1839	49.92%	16									
Bridgetown	3	0	11	0	926	1562	59.28%	12									
Manjimup Imperials	0	0	14	0	737	2013	36.61%	0									

2015

Lower South West	Wins	Byes	Losses	Draws	For	Against	%	Pts	Final	Team	G	B	Pts	Team	G	B	Pts
Deanmill	11	0	3	0	1268	802	158.10%	44	1st semi	Manjimup Imperials	12	9	81	Kojonup	10	17	77
Southerners	11	0	3	0	1364	922	147.94%	44	2nd semi	Southerners	13	10	88	Deanmill	11	6	72
Manjimup Imperials	10	0	4	0	1444	976	147.95%	40	Preliminary	Deanmill	13	12	90	Manjimup Imperials	10	8	68
Kojonup	9	0	5	0	1320	1035	127.54%	36	Grand	Deanmill	6	9	45	Southerners	4	8	32
Tigers	5	0	9	0	949	1175	80.77%	20									
Boyup Brook	3	0	11	0	989	1430	69.16%	12									
Bridgetown	0	0	14	0	650	1644	39.54%	0									

2016

Lower South West	Wins	Byes	Losses	Draws	For	Against	%	Pts	Final	Team	G	B	Pts	Team	G	B	Pts
Manjimup Imperials	11	0	3	0	1597	935	170.80%	44	1st semi	Deanmill	18	8	116	Bridgetown	8	10	58
Southerners	10	0	4	0	1362	843	161.57%	40	2nd semi	Manjimup Imperials	7	7	49	Southerners	3	7	25
Deanmill	10	0	4	0	1267	918	138.02%	40	Preliminary	Southerners	14	16	100	Deanmill	11	8	74
Bridgetown	9	0	5	0	1277	1238	103.15%	36	Grand	Southerners	14	15	99	Manjimup Imperials	7	7	49
Kojonup	5	0	9	0	893	1485	60.13%	20									
Tigers	4	0	10	0	1046	1399	74.77%	16									
Boyup Brook	0	0	14	0	879	1503	58.48%	0									

2017

Lower South West	Wins	Byes	Losses	Draws	For	Against	%	Pts	Final	Team	G	B	Pts	Team	G	B	Pts
Southerners	12	0	2	0	1809	557	324.78%	48	1st semi	Bridgetown	16	10	106	Deanmill	7	10	52
Manjimup Imperials	12	0	2	0	1663	977	170.21%	48	2nd semi	Southerners	22	10	142	Manjimup Imperials	6	12	48
Bridgetown	10	0	4	0	1409	1033	136.40%	40	Preliminary	Manjimup Imperials	15	12	102	Bridgetown	15	11	101
Deanmill	9	0	5	0	1359	1052	129.18%	36	Grand	Southerners	14	10	94	Manjimup Imperials	9	11	65
Boyup Brook	4	0	10	0	1089	1481	73.53%	16									
Kojonup	1	0	13	0	863	1822	47.37%	4									
Tigers	1	0	13	0	709	1979	35.83%	4									

2018

Lower South West	Wins	Byes	Losses	Draws	For	Against	%	Pts	Final	Team	G	B	Pts	Team	G	B	Pts
Deanmill	12	0	2	0	1625	696	233.48%	48	1st semi	Tigers	24	14	158	Bridgetown	5	5	35
Manjimup Imperials	11	0	3	0	1750	835	209.58%	44	2nd semi	Deanmill	15	18	108	Manjimup Imperials	7	6	48
Tigers	10	0	4	0	1404	914	153.61%	40	Preliminary	Manjimup Imperials	21	9	135	Tigers	14	6	90
Bridgetown	8	0	6	0	1271	1069	118.90%	32	Grand	Manjimup Imperials	14	6	90	Deanmill	12	16	88
Southerners	4	0	10	0	857	1531	55.98%	16									
Boyup Brook	3	0	11	0	1032	1452	71.07%	12									
Kojonup	1	0	13	0	596	2038	29.24%	4									

2019

Lower South West	Wins	Byes	Losses	Draws	For	Against	%	Pts	Final	Team	G	B	Pts	Team	G	B	Pts
Bridgetown	13	0	1	0	1577	635	248.35%	52	1st semi	Deanmill	11	6	72	Southerners	10	6	66
Manjimup Imperials	9	0	5	0	1198	1059	113.13%	36	2nd semi	Bridgetown	8	10	58	Manjimup Imperials	5	7	37
Deanmill	8	0	6	0	1028	807	127.39%	32	Preliminary	Deanmill	17	14	116	Manjimup Imperials	13	6	84
Southerners	7	0	6	1	957	919	104.13%	30	Grand	Bridgetown	11	14	80	Deanmill	9	7	61
Tigers	6	0	7	1	1011	1134	89.15%	26									
Kojonup	4	0	10	0	811	1250	64.88%	16									
Boyup Brook	1	0	13	0	628	1406	44.67%	4									
