= Central Great Southern Football League =

The Central Great Southern Football League (CGSFL) was based in and around the Shire of Katanning. Initially known as the Central Great Southern National Football League, it was formed at a meeting at Tambellup in December 1959 as the result of an amalgamation of the Katanning and Tambellup associations. There were eight participating clubs in the first season – Australs (Katanning), Broomehill, Gnowangerup, Kent District, Kojonup, Ongerup, Tambellup and Wanderers (Katanning). The Australs club was formed as the result of a merger of Imperials and Rovers prior to the 1960 season.

Broomehill and Ongerup departed at the end of the 1961 season to reduce the competition to six clubs. Cranbrook crossed over from the Southern Districts National Football League in 1970 but struggled and disbanded after the 1976 season, while Kent District moved to the Ongerup association in 1972.

The CGSNFL’s catchment area stretched further northwards with the admission of Dumbleyung in 1973 and Kukerin in 1983. The competition, which dropped ‘National’ from its title in 1981, consisted of seven clubs for most of the 1980s – Australs, Dumbleyung, Gnowangerup, Kojonup, Kukerin, Tambellup and Wanderers – until Dumbleyung left at the end of the 1987 season.

After the 1990 season, the CGSFL merged with the Southern Districts league to create the Great Southern Football League (GSFL). Australs, Kojonup, Tambellup and Wanderers all joined the new league while Kukerin joined the Upper Great Southern Football League as Kukerin-Dumbleyung.

Kojonup was the most successful club in the competition’s history with 11 premierships, including a hat-trick between 1964 and 1966, while Wanderers (six), Australs (five), Kukerin and Tambellup (four) and Dumbleyung all enjoyed premiership success.

The 1968 grand final between Kojonup and Wanderers was abandoned at half-time due to a severe hail storm, with Kojonup leading Wanderers 1.0 to 0.5. Kojonup captain-coach Graham Zilko was hospitalised due to hypothermia.

== Clubs ==
=== Final ===
Club	Colours	Nickname	Home Ground	Former League	Est.	Years in CGSFL	CGSFL Premierships		Fate
Club	Colours	Nickname	Home Ground	Former League	Est.	Years in CGSFL	Total	Years	Fate
Australs		Lions	Kupara Park, Katanning	–	1960	1960–1990	5	1970, 1971, 1972, 1975, 1978	Formed Great Southern FL in 1991
Kojonup		Magpies	Kojonup Oval, Kojonup	KFA	1923	1960–1990	11	1961, 1964, 1965, 1966, 1969, 1973, 1974, 1976, 1979, 1981, 1988	Formed Great Southern FL in 1991
Kukerin		The Big K, Kats	Nenke Oval, Kukerin	LGKDFA		1983–1990	4	1984, 1987, 1989, 1990	Merged with Dumbleyung to form Kukerin-Dumbleyung in the Upper Great Southern FL in 1991
Tambellup		Demons	Tambellup Oval, Tambellup	TFA		1960–1990	4	1960, 1962, 1980, 1982	Formed Great Southern FL in 1991
Wanderers		Tigers	Quartermaine Oval, Katanning	KFA	1923	1960–1990	6	1963, 1967, 1968, 1983, 1985, 1986	Formed Great Southern FL in 1991

=== Former ===
Club	Colours	Nickname	Home Ground	Former League	Est.	Years in CGSFL	CGSFL Premierships		Fate
Club	Colours	Nickname	Home Ground	Former League	Est.	Years in CGSFL	Total	Years	Fate
Broomehill			Broomehill Oval, Broomehill Village	TFA		1960-1961	0	-	Left league
Cranbrook		Blues	Cranbrook Showgrounds, Cranbrook	SDFL		1970-1978	0	-	Folded in 1978
Dumbleyung			Stubbs Park, Dumbleyung	DLGFA		1973–1988	1	1977	Entered recess after 1988. Merged with Kukerin in 1991 to form Kukerin-Dumbleyung
Gnowangerup		Bulldogs	Gnowangerup Sporting Complex, Gnowangerup	TFA	1917	1960–1986	0	-	Moved to Ongerup FA in 1987
Kent Districts		Hawks	Nyabing Oval, Nyabing	KFA	1954	1960–1971	0	-	Moved to Ongerup FA in 1972
Ongerup		Roos	Ongerup Sporting Complex, Ongerup	TFA	1936	1960-1961	0	-	Played socially in 1962 before forming the Ongerup FA in 1963

== Grand final results ==
Year	Premiers	Score	Runners up	Score
1960	Tambellup	9.16 (70)	Wanderers	8.19 (67)
1961	Kojonup	14.10 (94)	Wanderers	7.13 (55)
1962	Tambellup	14.15 (99)	Kojonup	9.10 (64)
1963	Wanderers	13.12 (90)	Tambellup	11.9 (75)
1964	Kojonup	9.9 (63)	Wanderers	7.7 (49)
1965	Kojonup	14.20 (104)	Wanderers	7.9 (51)
1966	Kojonup	6.8 (44)	Wanderers	3.6 (24)
1967	Wanderers	11.13 (79)	Kojonup	11.11 (77)
1968	Wanderers	15.6 (96)	Kojonup	10.10 (70)
1969	Kojonup	13.13 (91)	Australs	11.9 (75)
1970	Australs	23.25 (163)	Cranbrook	12.5 (77)
1971	Australs	17.9 (111)	Kojonup	10.12 (72)
1972	Australs	12.6 (78)	Kojonup	10.13 (73)
1973	Kojonup	10.14 (74)	Australs	8.11 (59)
1974	Kojonup	13.10 (88)	Australs	9.13 (67)
1975	Australs		Kojonup	
1976	Kojonup	16.14 (110)	Australs	13.12 (90)
1977	Dumbleyung	20.14 (134)	Australs	9.12 (66)
1978	Australs	17.4 (106)	Kojonup	13.12 (90)
1979	Kojonup	15.19 (109)	Australs	11.10 (76)
1980	Tambellup	15.3 (93)	Kojonup	12.13 (85)
1981	Kojonup	15.20 (110)	Tambellup	11.3 (69)
1982	Tambellup	16.7 (103)	Gnowangerup	12.14 (86)
1983	Wanderers	8.11 (59)	Kojonup	6.4 (40)
1984	Kukerin	19.19 (133)	Tambellup	8.12 (60)
1985	Wanderers	15.15 (105)	Tambellup	12.14 (86)
1986	Wanderers	17.12 (114)	Kojonup	14.12 (96)
1987	Kukerin	22.15 (147)	Tambellup	14.19 (103)
1988	Kojonup	15.16 (106)	Kukerin	8.8 (56)
1989	Kukerin	24.12 (156)	Kojonup	12.5 (77)
1990	Kukerin	19.10 (124)	Tambellup	15.10 (100)
