= Ongerup Football Association =

Football Competition

Ongerup Football Association
Established	1962
Teams	5
2026 premiers	Jerramungup
Most premierships	14 - Jerramungup

The Ongerup Football Association is an Australian rules football competition based in the Great Southern region of rural Western Australia. It was formed in 1962 with the current reserves competition inaugurated in 1980.

== History ==
The Association commenced in 1962 with just two clubs, Ongerup and Hassell. After two seasons, Borden and Pingrup joined, making four clubs. Hassell demerged in 1968 into Jerramungup and Boxwood Hills making five clubs.

Kent Districts joined in 1972 after leaving the Central Great Southern Football League and won the premiership the following year. Newdegate was next to join the Association when the ‘Lions’ entered in 1983. Gnowangerup then joined in 1987 after also leaving the CGSFL with the last team to join being Lake Grace with an immediate merger with Pingrup ending up in Lake Grace/Pingrup.

The 2010s was a tough decade for the OFA with Ongerup, Kent & Borden all folding taking it from an 8 to a 5 team competition.

== Clubs ==
=== Locations ===
Locations of the Ongerup FL clubs

==== Current ====
Club	Colours	Nickname	Home Ground	Former League	Est.	Years in OFA	Premierships			
Club	Colours	Nickname	Home Ground	Former League	Est.	Years in OFA	League		Reserves	
Club	Colours	Nickname	Home Ground	Former League	Est.	Years in OFA	Total	Years	Total	Years
Boxwood Hill		Bombers	Boxwood Town Oval, Boxwood Hill	–	1968	1968–	11	1970, 1977, 1978, 2000, 2002, 2003, 2004, 2005, 2006, 2018, 2019	9	1980, 2000, 2003, 2004, 2005, 2009, 2010, 2011, 2020
Gnowangerup		Bulldogs	Gnowangerup Sporting Complex, Gnowangerup	CGSFL	1917	1987–	7	1996, 2015, 2017, 2020, 2021, 2022, 2025	7	1994, 1995, 2012, 2015, 2016, 2019, 2021
Jerramungup		Eagles	Jerramungup Town Oval, Jerramungup	–	1968	1968–	14	1969, 1983, 1986, 1987, 1990, 1992, 1993, 2008, 2009, 2010, 2011, 2013, 2014, 2026	11	1985, 1991, 1992, 1993, 1996, 1997, 2006, 2014, 2017, 2024, 2026
Lake Grace-Pingrup		Bombers	Lake Grace Town Oval, Lake Grace and Pingrup Town Oval, Pingrup	–	1996	1996–	4	1998, 1999, 2012, 2024	5	2013, 2018, 2022, 2023, 2025
Newdegate		Lions	Newdegate Town Oval, Newdegate	LGKFA		1983–	6	1985, 1988, 1989, 1991, 2016, 2023	1	1998

=== Former ===
Club	Colours	Nickname	Home Ground	Former League	Est.	Years in OFA	Premierships				Fate
Club	Colours	Nickname	Home Ground	Former League	Est.	Years in OFA	League		Reserves		Fate
Club	Colours	Nickname	Home Ground	Former League	Est.	Years in OFA	Total	Years	Total	Years	Fate
Borden		Magpies	Borden Pavilion Sporting Complex, Borden	TFA		1964–2016	11	1964, 1967, 1968, 1971, 1974, 1975 1976, 1979, 1981, 1995, 1997	2	1983, 1984	Folded after 2016 season
Hassell			Jerramungup Town Oval, Jerramungup	–	1962	1962–1967	3	1963, 1965, 1966	0	-	Split into Boxwood Hill and Jerramungup in 1968
Kent Districts	(1970s)(2010s)	Hawks	Nyabing Oval, Nyabing	CGSFL	1954	1972–2010, 2012	2	1973, 2001	5	1982, 1986, 1999, 2001, 2002	Entered recess in 2011, returned in 2012 but folded at the end of the season.
Lake Grace		Bombers	Lake Grace Town Oval, Lake Grace	UGSFL		1995	0	-	0	-	Merged with Pingrup to form Lake Grace-Pingrup following 1995 season
Ongerup		Roos	Ongerup Sporting Complex, Ongerup	TFA	1936	1962–2010	7	1962, 1972, 1980, 1982, 1984, 1994, 2007	7	1981, 1987, 1988, 1989, 1990, 2007, 2008	Folded after 2010 season
Pingrup		Saints	Pingrup Town Oval, Pingrup	–	1964	1964–1995	0	-	0	-	Merged with Lake Grace to form Lake Grace-Pingrup following 1995 season

== Grand final results ==
Year	Premiers	Score	Runners up	Score
1962	Ongerup		Hassell	
1963	Hassell	7.16 (58)	Ongerup	7.13 (55)
1964	Borden	13.12 (90)	Hassell	10.6 (66)
1965	Hassell	9.12 (66)	Pingrup	5.6 (36)
1966	Hassell	9.9 (63)	Ongerup	6.12 (48)
1967	Borden	8.22 (70); 10.10 (70)	Hassell	10.10 (70); 6.10 (46)
1968	Borden	10.15 (75)	Jerramungup	5.9 (39)
1969	Jerramungup	10.19 (79)	Ongerup	5.5 (35)
1970	Boxwood Hill	12.18 (90)	Jerramungup	7.13 (55)
1971	Borden	10.10 (70)	Boxwood Hill	9.11 (65)
1972	Ongerup	9.9 (63)	Kent Districts #	9.6 (60)
1973	Kent Districts	11.12 (78)	Borden	6.14 (50)
1974	Borden	18.13 (121)	Boxwood Hill	16.17 (113)
1975	Borden	20.13 (133)	Ongerup	8.11 (59)
1976	Borden	21.13 (139)	Pingrup	8.10 (58)
1977	Boxwood Hill	14.9 (93)	Pingrup	4.9 (33)
1978	Boxwood Hill	16.17 (113)	Borden	6.9 (45)
1979	Borden	8.18 (66)	Jerramungup	2.17 (29)
1980	Ongerup	10.12 (72)	Boxwood Hill	10.6 (66)
1981	Borden	15.16 (106)	Ongerup	11.10 (76)
1982	Ongerup	12.12 (84)	Borden	7.14 (56)
1983	Jerramungup	15.16 (106)	Ongerup	12.7 (79)
1984	Ongerup	11.5 (71)	Borden	7.16 (58)
1985	Newdegate	7.7 (49)	Ongerup	4.6 (30)
1986	Jerramungup *	16.24 (120)	Newdegate	6.7 (43)
1987	Jerramungup	28.12 (180)	Pingrup #	13.14 (92)
1988	Newdegate	22.14 (146)	Ongerup	9.11 (65)
1989	Newdegate	14.15 (99)	Jerramungup	4.8 (32)
1990	Jerramungup	10.22 (82)	Newdegate	9.6 (60)
1991	Newdegate	17.28 (130)	Jerramungup	11.10 (76)
1992	Jerramungup *	17.11 (113)	Boxwood Hill	11.8 (74)
1993	Jerramungup	17.10 (112)	Ongerup	12.14 (86)
1994	Ongerup	15.12 (102)	Jerramungup	10.7 (67)
1995	Borden	11.7 (73)	Jerramungup	8.9 (57)
1996	Gnowangerup	11.3 (69)	Borden	8.20 (68)
1997	Borden	8.4 (52)	Gnowangerup	6.11 (47)
1998	Lake Grace-Pingrup	16.12 (108)	Jerramungup	15.6 (96)
1999	Lake Grace-Pingrup	7.13 (55)	Jerramungup	6.7 (43)
2000	Boxwood Hill	12.14 (86)	Jerramungup	7.8 (50)
2001	Kent Districts	13.8 (86)	Boxwood Hill	5.16 (46)
2002	Boxwood Hill	15.9 (99)	Jerramungup	14.10 (94)
2003	Boxwood Hill *	16.16 (112)	Jerramungup	9.12 (66)
2004	Boxwood Hill *	19.19 (133)	Ongerup	13.8 (86)
2005	Boxwood Hill	13.9 (87)	Newdegate	10.10 (70)
2006	Boxwood Hill	16.7 (103)	Newdegate	7.11 (53)
2007	Ongerup	15.11 (101)	Boxwood Hill	11.12 (78)
2008	Jerramungup	12.16 (88)	Gnowangerup	10.9 (69)
2009	Jerramungup *	13.7 (85)	Gnowangerup	9.11 (65)
2010	Jerramungup *	23.16 (154)	Ongerup	14.4 (88)
2011	Jerramungup	18.18 (126)	Gnowangerup	10.10 (70)
2012	Lake Grace-Pingrup	14.10 (94)	Jerramungup	13.14 (92)
2013	Jerramungup *	21.11 (137)	Lake Grace-Pingrup	7.12 (54)
2014	Jerramungup	14.9 (93)	Newdegate	7.10 (52)
2015	Gnowangerup	9.12 (66)	Newdegate	8.6 (54)
2016	Newdegate	18.9 (117)	Gnowangerup	9.5 (59)
2017	Gnowangerup	13.8 (86)	Boxwood Hill	10.11 (71)
2018	Boxwood Hill	20.19 (139)	Gnowangerup	11.5 (71)
2019	Boxwood Hill	19.15 (129)	Lake Grace-Pingrup	8.9 (57)
2020	Gnowangerup	15.11 (101)	Boxwood Hill	7.4 (46)
2021	Gnowangerup *	8.9 (57)	Boxwood Hill	5.5 (35)
2022	Gnowangerup	12.10 (82)	Lake Grace-Pingrup	9.8 (62)
2023	Newdegate	8.7 (55)	Lake Grace-Pingrup	4.2 (26)
2024	Lake Grace-Pingrup	12.5 (77)	Gnowangerup	6.7 (43)
2025	Gnowangerup	7.7 (49)	Jerramungup	5.5 (35)
2026	Jerramungup	17.12 (114)	Lake Grace-Pingrup	7.5 (47)

Notes:
* Undefeated season, # First loss of season
OFA Grand Final Program 2020

== Ladders ==
=== 2015 ladder ===
Ongerup	Wins	Byes	Losses	Draws	For	Against	%	Pts	Final	Team	G	B	Pts	Team	G	B	Pts
Gnowangerup	14	0	1	0	1933	860	224.77%	56	1st semi	Jerramungup	15	13	103	Lake Grace/Pingrup	11	10	76
Newdegate	11	0	4	0	1494	994	150.30%	44	2nd semi	Gnowangerup	16	15	111	Newdegate	10	8	68
Jerramungup	11	0	4	0	1553	1065	145.82%	44	Preliminary	Newdegate	12	6	78	Jerramungup	7	10	52
Lake Grace/Pingrup	4	0	11	0	1060	1495	70.90%	16	Grand	Gnowangerup	9	12	66	Newdegate	8	6	54
Boxwood Hill	4	0	11	0	922	1583	58.24%	16									
Borden	1	0	14	0	883	1848	47.78%	4									

=== 2016 ladder ===
Ongerup	Wins	Byes	Losses	Draws	For	Against	%	Pts	Final	Team	G	B	Pts	Team	G	B	Pts
Newdegate	12	0	3	0	1321	848	155.78%	48	1st semi	Gnowangerup	16	13	109	Lake Grace/Pingrup	13	10	88
Jerramungup	11	0	4	0	1276	1018	125.34%	44	2nd semi	Newdegate	9	8	62	Jerramungup	8	9	57
Lake Grace/Pingrup	9	0	6	0	1202	1165	103.18%	36	Preliminary	Gnowangerup	11	9	75	Jerramungup	4	9	33
Gnowangerup	8	0	7	0	1553	1095	141.83%	32	Grand	Newdegate	18	9	117	Gnowangerup	9	5	59
Boxwood Hill	5	0	10	0	1176	1172	100.34%	20									
Borden	0	0	15	0	766	1996	38.38%	0									

=== 2017 ladder ===
Ongerup	Wins	Byes	Losses	Draws	For	Against	%	Pts	Final	Team	G	B	Pts	Team	G	B	Pts
Gnowangerup	11	0	1	0	1205	651	185.10%	44	Grand	Gnowangerup	13	8	86	Boxwood Hills	10	11	71
Boxwood Hill	9	0	3	0	1148	645	177.98%	36									
Newdegate	4	0	8	0	836	1037	80.62%	16	1st semi	Newdegate	10	22	82	Jerramungup	9	5	59
Jerramungup	3	0	9	0	866	1106	78.30%	12	2nd semi	Gnowangerup	14	10	94	Boxwood Hills	9	5	59
Lake Grace/Pingrup	3	0	9	0	683	1299	52.58%	12	Preliminary	Boxwood Hill	13	16	94	Newdegate	10	8	68

=== 2018 ladder ===
Ongerup	Wins	Byes	Losses	Draws	For	Against	%	Pts	Final	Team	G	B	Pts	Team	G	B	Pts
Gnowangerup	10	0	2	0	1200	774	155.04%	40	1st semi	Newdegate	21	8	134	Jerramungup	10	4	64
Boxwood Hill	8	0	4	0	1104	806	136.97%	32	2nd semi	Boxwood Hill	17	13	115	Gnowangerup	6	7	43
Newdegate	8	0	4	0	975	954	102.20%	32	Preliminary	Gnowangerup	10	7	67	Newdegate	8	8	56
Jerramungup	3	0	9	0	757	1118	67.71%	12	Grand	Boxwood Hill	20	19	139	Gnowangerup	11	5	71
Lake Grace/Pingrup	1	0	11	0	724	1108	65.34%	4									

=== 2019 ladder ===
Ongerup	Wins	Byes	Losses	Draws	For	Against	%	Pts	Final	Team	G	B	Pts	Team	G	B	Pts
Boxwood Hills	11	0	1	0	1338	531	251.98%	44	1st semi	Newdegate	13	7	85	Gnowangerup	8	10	58
Lake Grace/Pingrup	8	0	4	0	1067	820	130.12%	32	2nd semi	Boxwood Hills	11	9	75	Lake Grace/Pingrup	10	5	65
Gnowangerup	5	0	7	0	657	916	71.72%	20	Preliminary	Lake Grace/Pingrup	12	10	82	Newdegate	6	9	45
Newdegate	5	0	7	0	742	1041	71.28%	20	Grand	Boxwood Hill	19	15	129	Lake Grace/Pingrup	8	9	57
Jerramungup	1	0	11	0	645	1141	56.53%	4									

=== 2020 ladder ===
Shortened season due to the COVID-19 pandemic

Ongerup	Wins	Losses	Draws	For	Against	%	Pts	Final	Team	G	B	Pts	Team	G	B	Pts
Gnowangerup	4	0	0	316	142	222.54%	16	2nd semi	Gnowangerup	9	3	57	Boxwood Hill	11	10	76
Boxwood Hill	3	1	0	282	168	167.86%	12	1st semi	Lake Grace/Pingrup	14	9	93	Jerramungup	10	6	66
Lake Grace/Pingrup	2	2	0	206	197	104.57	8	Preliminary	Gnowangerup	20	19	139	Lake Grace/Pingrup	3	5	23
Jerramungup	1	3	0	172	279	61.65	4	Grand	Boxwood Hill	7	4	46	Gnowangerup	15	11	101
Newdegate	0	4	0	108	298	36.24	0									

== AFL players ==
- Tony Evans - West Coast
- Quentin Lynch - West Coast, Collingwood
- Jason Spinks - Sydney, West Coast
- Brett Spinks - West Coast, Geelong
- Chris Mayne - Fremantle, Collingwood
- Mark Williams - Hawthorn, Essendon
- Cale Morton - Melbourne
- Jarrod Morton - Hawthorn
- Mitch Morton - West Coast, Richmond, Sydney
- Liam Baker - Richmond
- Nat Fyfe - Fremantle
- Angus Litherland - Hawthorn
