= Darrell Panizza =

Australian rules footballer and coach

Personal information
- Full name: Darrell Peter Panizza
- Nickname: Dollar
- Born: 11 March 1959 (age 67); Bunbury, Western Australia
- Original team: Albany Royals
- Positions: Wing, defender

Playing career^{1}
Years	Club	Games (Goals)
1979–1986, 1990–1995	Claremont	274 (114)
1987–1989	Woodville	74 (?)

Representative team honours
Years	Team	Games (Goals)
1982–1991	Western Australia	6 (1)

Coaching career
Years	Club	Games (W–L–D)
1995–1997	Claremont	
1997	Western Australia	1 (0–1–0)
- ^{1} Playing statistics correct to the end of 1989.

Darrell Peter Panizza (born 11 March 1959 in Bunbury, Western Australia) is a former Australian rules footballer who represented Claremont in the West Australian Football League (WAFL) and the now-defunct Woodville Football Club in the South Australian National Football League (SANFL) during the 1980s and 1990s. He also represented and coached Western Australia in interstate football.

== Playing career ==
=== Claremont ===
Panizza joined Claremont in 1979 from the Albany Royals and played in WAFL premiership teams in 1981, 1991 and 1993. He retired having played 274 matches in two stints, the first between 1979 and 1986; and the second between 1990 and 1995. He holds the record for the most games played at Claremont.

=== Woodville ===
In 1987 he moved to South Australian National Football League (SANFL) club Woodville where he played 74 matches in three seasons.

=== Western Australia ===
Panizza played six games for Western Australia including the 1983 side that won the Australian Championships.

== Coaching career ==
=== Claremont ===
In 1996, after retiring as a player he coached Claremont to a WAFL premiership.

=== Royals ===
Rejoining his boyhood club, Panizza took the Royals to unprecedented success, winning six Great Southern Football League premierships between 1999 and 2004.

== Hall of Fame ==
Panizza was inducted into the WA Football Hall of Fame in March 2009.
