= Royals Football Club =

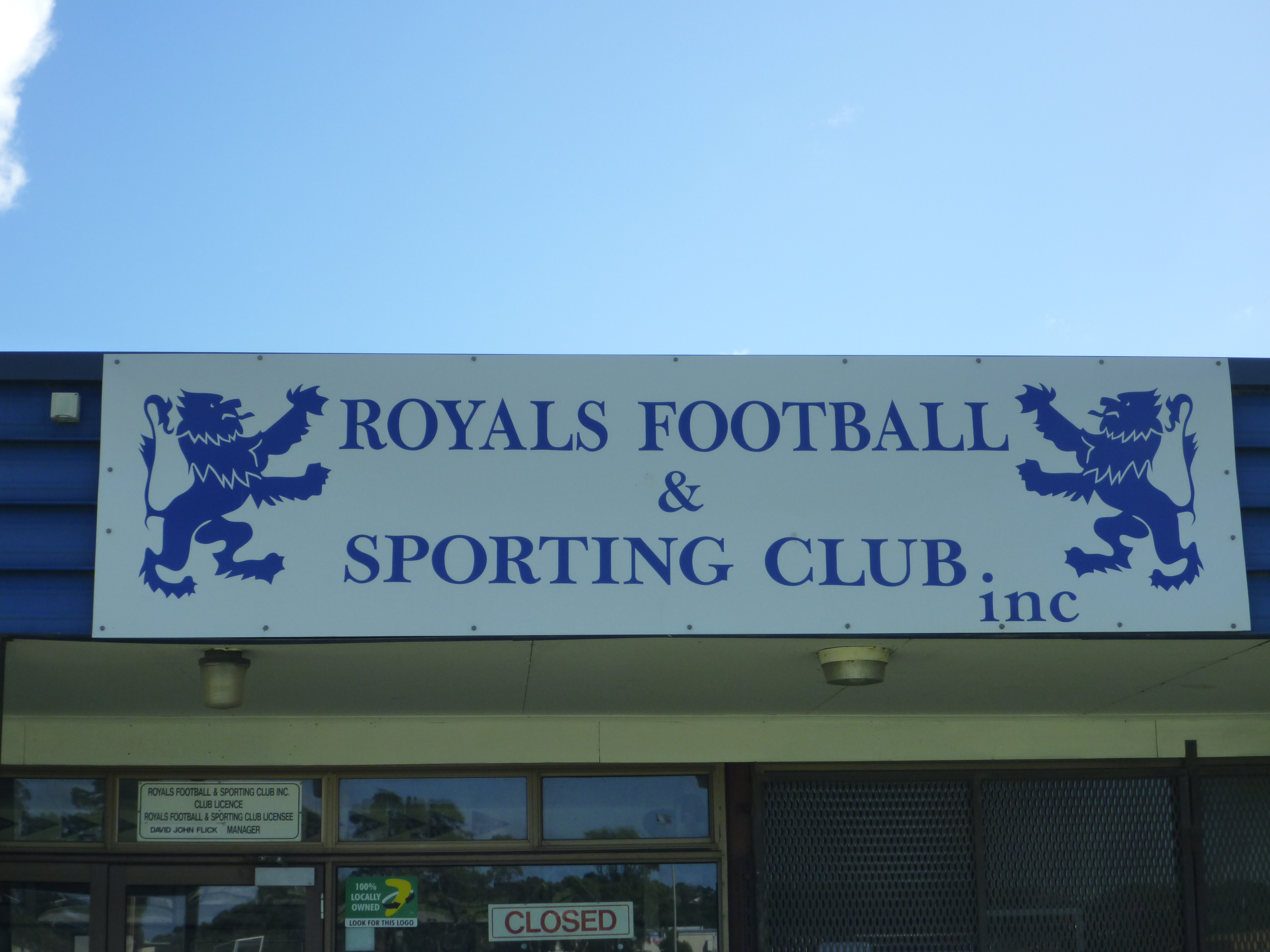
- Full name: Royals Football Club
- Sport: Australian rules football
- Founded: 1897
- First season: 1897
- League: Great Southern Football League
- Home ground: Centennial Oval, Albany
- President: Barry Panizza
- Head coach: Darrell Panizza

Strip
- Blue with White V

Royals Football Club or Royals Football and Sporting Club, is an Australian rules football club located in Albany, Western Australia playing in the Great Southern Football League (Western Australia).

The home ground is called Centennial Oval which is situated in the suburb of Centennial Park. The oval is part of the Albany show grounds.

== History ==
The founders of the Albany Football Association decided to create wards for the towns new football competition. There were three wards, North, East and West. All matches were to be played at the Parade Street Oval. In 1897 football players from the West Ward formed a club called the West Albany Football Club.

For the next 40 years they played as West Albany until WWII suspended football in the town. In 1944 a wartime league began for moral and the Air Training Corps was formed by air force personnel and they used the West's equipment. They competed until 1952 when they decided to become the Royals.

Royals won a hat-trick of premierships in 1993, 1994 and 1995. They then won an unprecedented six premierships in a row between 1999 and 2004 under the reign of coach Darrell Panizza.

The Royals League team were defeated in the 2007 Grand Final by North Albany the score was North Albany 18.19 (127) Royals 15.15 (105).

North Albany 15.8 (98) beat Royals 5.7 (37) again in the 2008 Grand Final.

In 2009, Royals had a better season with them winning the minor premiership and then defeating North Albany in the Grand Final. The scoreline was Royals 13.13 (91) to North Albany 12.10 (82). Cleve Humphries from Royals was judged best on ground.

Royals commenced the 2010 season without their captain, Trevor Craig, and other senior players from the 2009 season. James McRae also has left the club to become the captain-coach of the Denmark Magpies.

== Premierships ==
- Albany Football Association (1897-1957)
  - as West Albany 1898, 1919, 1920, 1921, 1922, 1923, 1924, 1928, 1940
  - as Air Training Corps 1945, 1947, 1950
  - as Royals 1955, 1956, 1957
- Southern Districts Football League (1958-1990)
  - 1958, 1959, 1960, 1990
- Great Southern football League (1991-2017)
  - 1993, 1994, 1995, 1999, 2000, 2001, 2002, 2003, 2004, 2009, 2011

== See also ==
- Great Southern Football League (Western Australia)
