= Great Southern Football League (Western Australia) =

Australian rules football league in Western Australia

Great Southern; Football League
Established	1991
Teams	6
2026 League premiers	Albany
2026 Reserves premiers	Mount Barker
2026 Colts premiers	Denmark-Walpole
2026 Under 16s premiers	Mount Barker
2026 Women's premiers	Railways
2026 Youth Girls premiers	North Albany

The Great Southern Football League is an Australian rules football league based in the state of Western Australia, incorporating teams from towns located within the Great Southern region. The league was formed in 1991 after an amalgamation of the Southern Districts (Denmark, Royals, North Mt Barker, North Albany, Railways, South Mt Barker) and Central Great Southern Football League (Australs, Kojonup, Tambellup, Wanderers, Dumbleyung) Leagues in 1991. All but Denmark and Dumbleyung formed teams in the initial season of the league. There are currently 6 teams covering all tiers of the league.

== Clubs ==
=== Locations ===
Locations of the Great Southern FL clubs

=== Current ===
Club	Colours	Logo	Home ground	Former League	Est.	Years in GSFL	GSFL Premierships	
Club	Colours	Logo	Home ground	Former League	Est.	Years in GSFL	Total	Years
Albany		Sharks	Centennial Oval, Centennial Park	–	2009	2009-	3	2023, 2024, 2026
Denmark Walpole		Magpies	McLean Park, Denmark	–	1997	1997–	1	2010
Mount Barker		Bulls	Souness Park, Mount Barker	–	1994	1994–	1	1996
North Albany		Kangas	Collingwood Park, Collingwood Park	SDFA	1897	1991–	9	2005, 2006, 2007, 2008, 2014, 2015, 2016, 2017, 2018
Railways		Tigers	Railways Oval, Centennial Park	SDFA	1946	1991–	5	2012, 2013, 2021, 2022, 2025
Royals		Lions	Centennial Oval, Centennial Park	SDFA	1897	1991–	14	1993, 1994, 1995, 1999, 2000, 2001, 2002, 2003, 2004, 2009, 2011, 2019, 2020

=== Former ===
Club	Colours	Logo	Home ground	Former League	Est.	Years in GSFL	GSFL Premierships		Fate
Club	Colours	Logo	Home ground	Former League	Est.	Years in GSFL	Total	Years	Fate
Katanning Australs		Bulls	Kupara Park, Katanning	CGSFL	1960	1991–1999	0	-	Excluded from the GSFL for the 2001 season and never rejoined. Now in recess.
Katanning Wanderers		Tigers	Kupara Park, Katanning	CGSFL	1922	1991–2002	0	-	Joined Upper Great Southern FL in 2003
Kojonup		Magpies	Kojonup Oval, Kojonup	CGSFL	1923	1991–2007	1	1997	Moved to Lower South West FL in 2008
North Mount Barker		Demons	Frost Park, Mount Barker	SDFA	1921	1991–1993	0	-	Folded in 1993, re-formed as the Mount Barker Bulls in 1994
South Mount Barker		Hawks	Souness Park, Mount Barker	SDFA	1921	1991–2004	1	1992	Withdrew in 2005. Now in recess
Tambellup		Demons	Tambellup Oval, Tambellup	CGSFL		1991–2006	2	1991, 1998	Folded in 2007

== Grand final results ==
Year	Premiers	Score	Runners up	Score
1991	Tambellup	14.13 (97)	South Mt Barker	10.6 (66)
1992	South Mt Barker	9.14 (68)	Royals	7.7 (49)
1993	Royals	18.12 (120)	Tambellup	11.9 (75)
1994	Royals	20.9 (129)	Tambellup	10.12 (72)
1995	Royals	19.8 (122)	Tambellup	11.9 (75)
1996	Mt Barker	17.18 (120)	Railways	13.8 (86)
1997	Kojonup	13.7 (85)	Railways	9.8 (62)
1998	Tambellup	18.11 (119)	Wanderers	18.5 (113)
1999	Royals	12.11 (83)	Mt Barker	9.14 (68)
2000	Royals	12.5 (77)	Railways	7.4 (46)
2001	Royals	10.12 (72)	Railways	9.7 (61)
2002	Royals	9.12 (66)	Wanderers	5.3 (33)
2003	Royals	16.15 (111)	North Albany	9.9 (63)
2004	Royals	18.8 (116)	Tambellup	10.15 (75)
2005	North Albany	22.12 (144)	Railways	12.9 (81)
2006	North Albany	13.15 (93)	Railways	9.7 (61)
2007	North Albany	18.19 (127)	Royals	15.15 (105)
2008	North Albany	15.8 (98)	Royals	5.7 (37)
2009	Royals	13.13 (91)	North Albany	12.10 (82)
2010	Denmark-Walpole	15.5 (95)	Royals	7.11 (53)
2011	Royals	10.5 (65)	Railways	6.5 (41)
2012	Railways	15.13 (103)	Denmark-Walpole	5.13 (43)
2013	Railways	14.8 (92)	North Albany	10.10 (70)
2014	North Albany	19.16 (130)	Royals	4.6 (30)
2015	North Albany	9.11 (65)	Railways	8.11 (59)
2016	North Albany	8.13 (61)	Mt Barker	7.16 (58).
2017	North Albany	9.8 (62)	Royals	8.11 (59)
2018	North Albany	9.7 (61)	Railways	6.8 (44)
2019	Royals	14.12 (96)	Railways	8.7 (55)
2020	Royals	13.11 (89)	Denmark-Walpole	7.3 (45)
2021	Railways	17.10 (112)	Royals	12.12 (84)
2022	Railways	15.8 (98)	Albany	10.9 (69)
2023	Albany	9.12 (66)	Railways	7.6 (48)
2024	Albany	10.14 (75)	Royals	8.5 (53)
2025	Railways	8.10 (58)	Albany	6.7 (43)
2026	Albany	14.15 (99)	Royals	5.6 (36)

== Derbies ==
Current Derbies
Railways and Royals (Cross street rivals)
Denmark/Walpole and Mt Barker (Small town rivalry)
North Albany and Royals (Red & Whites vs Blue & Whites has always been the traditional since the SDNFL days)

Previous Derbies
Australs and Wanderers (Small town rivalry)
North Mt Barker Demons and South Mt Barker Hawks (Small town rivalry)
