= Mount Barker Football Club =

Australian rules football club

Mount Barker Bulls

Names
- Full name: Mount Barker Football Club
- Nickname: Bulls

Club details
- Founded: 1994 (men's), 2020 (women's)
- Colours: Green White Black
- Competition: Great Southern Football League (GSFL)
- President: Jarrad Beech
- Coach: Gary Pope (Men's League); Sheridan Kowald (Women's)
- Captain(s): Brent Parsons (M), Sarah Eisenberg (W)
- Premierships: Men's- One (1996); Women's - Two (2024-2025)
- Ground: Sounness Park, Mount Barker (capacity: 1,000)
- Former ground: Frost Oval

Other information
- Official website: (Unofficial facebook page)

The Mount Barker Football Club is an Australian rules football club located in Mount Barker, Western Australia. Nicknamed the Bulls, the club plays in the Great Southern Football League, with home games originally being hosted at Frost Oval (aka Frost Park) in Mount Barker but changed to Sounness Park in 2015.

== Club history ==
During the early 1990s both the North and South Mount Barker Football Clubs were not performing well. Two teams in a small town stretched the limited number of players. Members of the North Mount Barker Football Club (the Demons) approached the South Mount Barker Hawks with the proposal that both teams amalgamate to make a stronger team for the town. Talks broke down and in 1993 the Demons were wound up and the Mount Barker Football Club was formed. The Hawks stayed on as a team but their coach and a number of players joined the newly founded Bulls.

As of 2015, home games will be played at Sounness Park, Mount Barker.

The Great Southern Football League included women's teams from 2018. The Mount Barker Bulls Women's team was founded in 2019, with the first season played in 2020.

== Honourboard ==
=== League ===
Year	Coach	Captain	Best & Fairest (Russell Jones Memorial Trophy)	Place
1994	Russell Cooper	Alec Williams	Russell Jones	
1995	Merv Neagle	Alec Williams	Alec Williams	
1996	Merv Neagle	Alec Williams	Alec Williams	Premiers
1997	Alec Williams	Murray Anning	Steven Mead	
1998	Alec Williams		James Wynne	
1999	Merv Neagle	Murray Anning	Kim Lange	
2000	Rob Laidler	Shane Kirkwood	Kim Lange	
2001	John Wright	Matt Taylor	Justin Parsons	
2002	Mark Greene	Matt Taylor	Rhett Parsons	
2003	Mick Mustey	Matt Taylor	Sam Lehmann	
2004	Garry Coffey	Tom Pollard	Brett Colbung	
2005	Garry Coffey	Tom Pollard	Justin Parsons	
2006	Garry Coffey	Tom Pollard	Sam Lehmann	
2007	Greg Bunker	Craig Pieper	Adam Pitt	
2008	Greg Bunker	Tristan King	Luke McPartland	
2009	Merv Neagle	Peter Taylor	Sam Lehmann	
2010	Gavin Morgan	Sam Lehmann	Peter Taylor	
2011	Matt Taylor	Sam Lehmann	Sam Lehmann	5th
2012	Matt Taylor	Sam Lehmann	Sam Lehmann	3rd
2013	Phil Gilbert	Sam Lehmann	Sam Lehmann	4th
2014	Ryan Ballard	Sam Lehmann	Nathan Skinner	5th
2015	Ryan Ballard	Sam Lehmann	Peter Taylor	5th
2016	Shane Thompson	Sam Lehmann	Peter Taylor	2nd
2017	Shane Thompson	Sam Lehmann	Corey Byrne	3rd
2018	Brad Hook	Peter Taylor	Joel Gray	3rd
2019	Brad Hook	Peter Taylor	Sam Lehmann	3rd
2020	Brad Hook	Peter Taylor	Lee Pavlovich	5th
2021	David Johnson	David Stone	Scott Price	5th
2022	David Johnson	David Stone	Zach Jackson	2nd
2023	Brad Hook	David Stone	Daniel Patching	4th
2024	Brad Hook	David Stone	Daniel Patching	4th
2025	Gary Pope	Brent Parsons	Darcy Wallinger	2nd
2026	Gary Pope	Brent Parsons		

=== Reserves ===
Year	Coach	Captain	Best & Fairest
1994	Winston Williams	Winston Williams	Greg Gray
1995	Paul Garbellini	Brad Kleemann	Daryl Williams
1996			Paul Wegner
1997	Billy Krakouer		Kelvin Anning
1998	John Wright		Craig Dayman
1999	John Wright/Murray Anning	Various each week	John Wright
2000	John Wright	Greg Melia & Danny Richmond	Pete Horsington
2001	Shane Kirkwood	Various each week	Cameron Williamson
2002	Shane Kirkwood	Various each week	Cameron Williamson
2003	Shane Kirkwood	Kim Skinner	Daniel Martin
2004	Tom Pollard	Various each week	Daniel Martin
2005	Tom Pollard	Daniel Martin	Jeremy Godden
2006	Syd Anning	Josh Toovey	Shane Kirkwood
2007	John Wright/Michael Baker	Various each week	Paul Anning
2008	Syd Anning	Various each week	Josh Toovey
2009	Cecil Wynne Sr.	Brad McLean	Sam Hobley
2010	Cecil Wynne Sr.	Shane Ugle	Jarrad Beech
2011	Brett Greeney	Pete Horsington	Shane Van Reeken
2012	Brett Greeney	Damon Brennan	Michael Baker
2013	Pete Horsington	Tristan King	Tristan King
2014	Jay Rowles	Tristan King	Dylan Pieper
2015	Danny Richmond	Jarrad Beech	Henry Graham
2016	Antony Sewell	Clinton Gilbert	Tristan King
2017	Tristan King	Clinton Gilbert	Ryan Ballard
2018	Tristan King	Justin Parsons	Justin Parsons
2019	Tristan King	Justin Parsons	Justin Parsons
2020	Tristan King	Matt Gilbert	Mick Hick
2021	Tristan King	Clinton Gilbert & Bradyn Bennett	Ryan Ballard
2022	Tristan King	Various each week	James Farmer
2023	Terry (Choco) Williams	Troy Simmons	Sam Lehmann
2024	Terry (Choco) Williams	Damon Simpson & Cameron Ward	Jarrod Pearce
2025	Damon Simpson	Cameron Ward	Ross Douglas
2026	Damon Simpson	Troy Simmons	

=== Colts ===
Year	Coach	Captain	Best & Fairest
1994	Alec Williams	Darryn Ashton	Gavin Wilkes
1995	Alec Williams	Matthew Taylor	Matthew Taylor
1996	Garry Coffey	Brad Hook	
1997	Garry Coffey		Dylan Henderson
1998	Garry Coffey		Kris Waddington
1999	Charlie Staite	David Melia	David Melia
2000	Wayne Donohoe	Tristan King	Laurence Hurst
2001	Paul Garbellini	Mathew Stamopolous	Dylan Trent
2002	Paul Garbellini	Various each week	Peter Taylor
2003	Gary Coffey	Ben Oldfield	Andy Evans
2004	Troy Hornby	Peter Taylor/Jamie Pickles	Johnno Standish
2005	Jarrad Gardner	Craig Anning	Ben Ireland
2006	No team	-	-
2007	Dylan Judd	Steven Scott	Steven Scott
2008	Stuart Duggin	Angus Meredith	Angus Meredith
2009	Stuart Duggin	Liam Gardner	Luke St Jack
2010	Brett Greeney	Luke St Jack	Jack Bowden
2011	No Team	-	-
2012	No Team	-	-
2013	Jay Rowles	Daniel Richardson	Beau Thomason
2014	No Team	-	-
2015	No Team	-	-
2016	Jay Rowles	Joel Gray	Joel Gray
2017	David Stone	Jacob Skinner	Aidin Williss
2018	Terry Williams	Rhys Hogg	Nitan Benavides
2019	Terry Williams	Jamie Lawn & Bryton Dorain	Jye Williss
2020	Ryan Ballard	Tristan Ballard	Locke Rowland
2021	Clinton Smart	Josh Davenport	Ben Kirkwood
2022	Jay Rowles	Alex Skinner	Alex Skinner
2023	No Team		
2024	Cain Askevold	Chesta Grinham	Isaac Penny
2025	No Team		

=== Under 17s ===
Year	Coach	Captain	Best & Fairest
2011	Brad Hook	Jack Bowden	Jack Bowden
2012	Brad Hook	Dean Couper	Russell Wynne
2013	Dean Braithwaite	Zettlin Weedon	Zettlin Weedon
2014	Gordon Reid	Joel Gray	Joel Gray
2015	Jay Rowles	Jordon Reid	Jordon Reid & Aidin Williss

=== Under 16s ===
Year	Coach	Captain	Best & Fairest
2018	Clint Williss	Jye Williss	Heath Brown
2019	Ryan Ballard	Tristan Ballard	Tristan Ballard
2020	Luis Benavides	Sebastian Ballard	Ben Kirkwood
2021	Cain Askevold	Alex Skinner & Will Watkin	Jarrod Pearce
2022	Cain Askevold	Cameron Walsh	Tylah Williams
2023	Cain Askevold	Jared Ballard	Jared Ballard
2024	Cain Askevold	Logan Miller	Lucas Baker
2025	Daniel Baker	Lucas Baker / Harley Waddington	Lucas Baker
2026	Cain Askevold	Rahzell Kittow	

=== Women's ===
Year	Coach	Captain	Best & Fairest
2020	Brad Hook	Kate Harriss	Georgia Kowald
2021	Cain Askevold	Kate Harriss	Georgia Kowald
2022	Cameron Bergsma		Sophie Richards
2023	Cain Askevold	Simone Pantall & Joanne Porteous	Kaitlin Eades
2024	Sheridan Kowald	Sarah Eisenberg	Sophie Richards
2025	Sheridan Kowald	Sarah Eisenberg	Sophie Richards
2026	Sheridan Kowald	Sarah Eisenberg	Charlotte Ballard

== Records and achievements ==
=== Records ===
Highest Score: 34.22 (226) v. Albany (Round 3, 2012)

Lowest Score: 0.3 (3) v. Railways (Round 8, 2007)

Highest winning margin: 193 points - 32.13 (205) v. 1.6 (12) against Denmark/Walpole (Round 2, 2002)

=== Premierships ===
League: 1: 1996

Women's: 2: 2024, 2025

Reserves: 2: 1999, 2011, 2020

Colts: 1: 1997

Under 17's: 1: 2015

== Other GSFL Awards ==
=== Kleemann Medalists (GSFL League Fairest & Best) ===
1997 - Steven Mead
2011 - Sam Lehmann
2022 - Zachary Jackson

=== League Leading Goalkicker ===
2004 - Brett Greeney (48)
2009 - Ben Saunders (41)
2019 - Dionne Woods (42)

Women's League leading Goalkicker

2024 - Mikayla Balloch

=== Charlie Punch Medal (GSFL Reserves Fairest & Best) ===
2007 - Tynan Coffey
2017 - Ryan Ballard

=== Warrick Proudlove Medal (GSFL Colts Fairest & Best) ===
2015 - Kenneth Farmer
2019 - Arthur Jones

=== Reserves Leading Goalkicker ===
2008 - Paul Anning (24)

=== Rod Gillies Medal (GSFL Colts Fairest & Best) ===
1997 - Shane Thompson

=== Colts Leading Goalkicker ===
2008 - Ben Saunders (68)

=== Harry Reeves Colts Best & Fairest - Great Southern Carnival ===
2006 - Luke McPartland

== AFL Players ==
AFL player Aaron Sandilands (Fremantle) started his football career playing for the Bulls Under 17s.
Former Essendon and Sydney player Merv Neagle has coached and played for the Bulls.

== WAFL Players ==
Five former Bulls played WAFL and one is an assistant coach.

- Ben Saunders played league and reserves for South Fremantle in 2018.
- Russell Wynne played league and reserves for East Fremantle in 2018.
- Cameron Quenby and Jordon Reid played reserves for Claremont in 2018.
- Aidin Williss was listed in Claremont's playing roster.
- Shane Thompson (former player and coach) is an assistant coach at East Fremantle.
- Tristan Ballard played Reserves for Claremont in 2024.
- Sebastian Ballard played in the 2023 Grand Final for Claremont Colts.
- Jared Ballard is currently on the Claremont Colts roster in 2026.

Former MBFC players Dale Ballantyne and Justin Parsons have played for Claremont Football Club.
