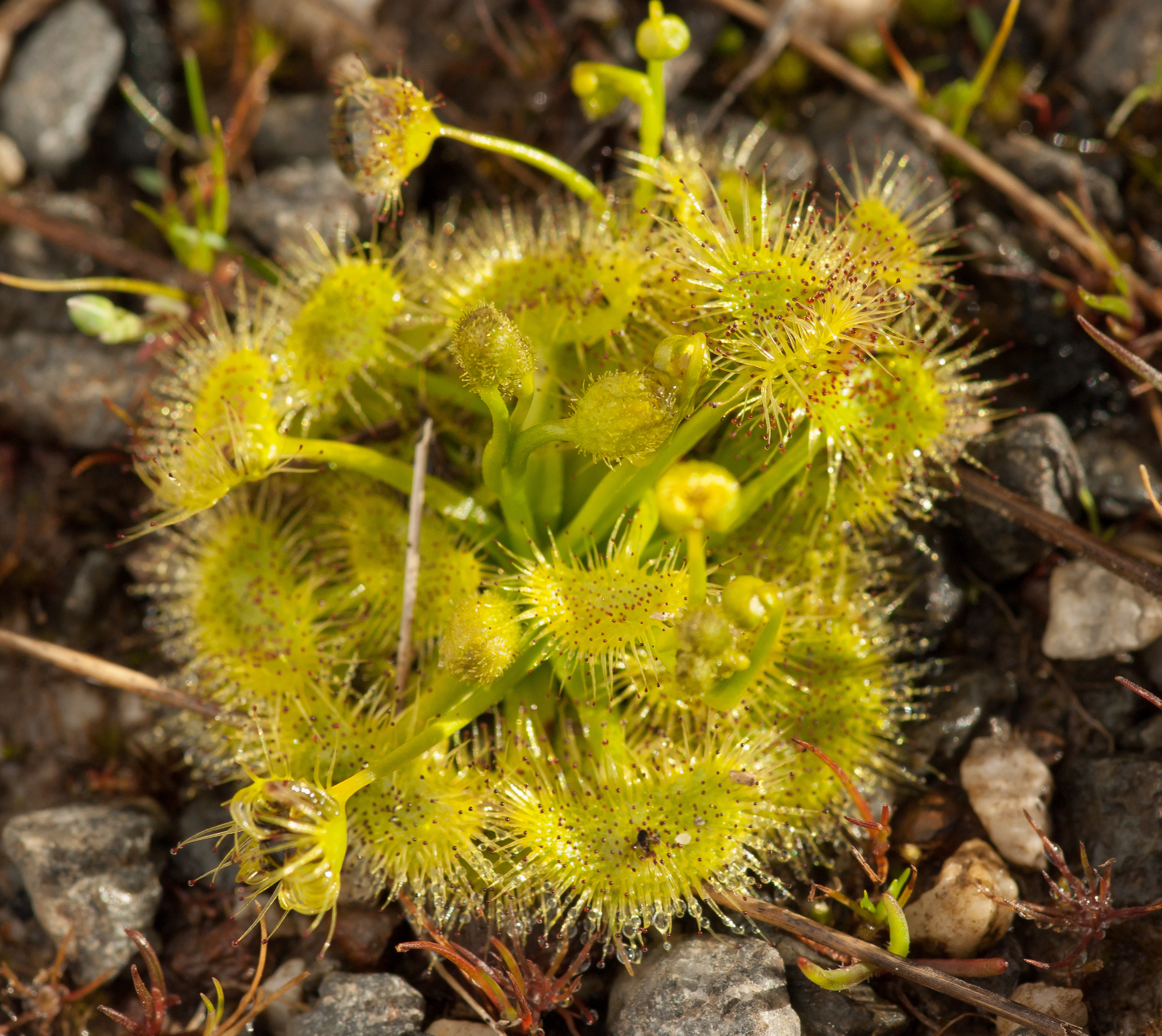

Scientific classification
- Kingdom: Plantae
- Clade: Tracheophytes
- Clade: Angiosperms
- Clade: Eudicots
- Order: Caryophyllales
- Family: Droseraceae
- Genus: Drosera
- Subgenus: Drosera subg. Ergaleium
- Section: Drosera sect. Ergaleium
- Species: D. hookeri

Binomial name
- Drosera hookeri R.P.Gibson, B.J.Conn & Conran

Synonyms
- D. foliosa Planch.; D. peltata var. foliosa (Planch.) Benth.

= Drosera hookeri =

Grassland sundew

Species of carnivorous plant

Drosera hookeri, the grassland sundew is an shortly erect perennial tuberous species in the carnivorous plant genus Drosera. Drosera hookeri is found in south-eastern Australia. Although the holotype was collected in Tasmania, its distribution also includes Victoria, New South Wales and South Australia.

== Botanical history ==
This species has a complex taxonomic history, and its specific epithet acknowledges the original recognition of the taxon by Joseph Dalton Hooker. Hooker originally called his species Drosera foliosa Hook.f. ex Planch. in 1848, a name that was illegitimate as it had previously been used to describe a different species (Drosera foliosa Elliott 1824). The nomenclature of D. hookeri was later clarified and the taxonomic concept significantly broadened to include most of the south-eastern Australian and New Zealand forms of the species complex that includes Drosera peltata.

Like other tuber sundews, D. hookeri aestivates as an underground tuber to survive summer drought.

== Description ==
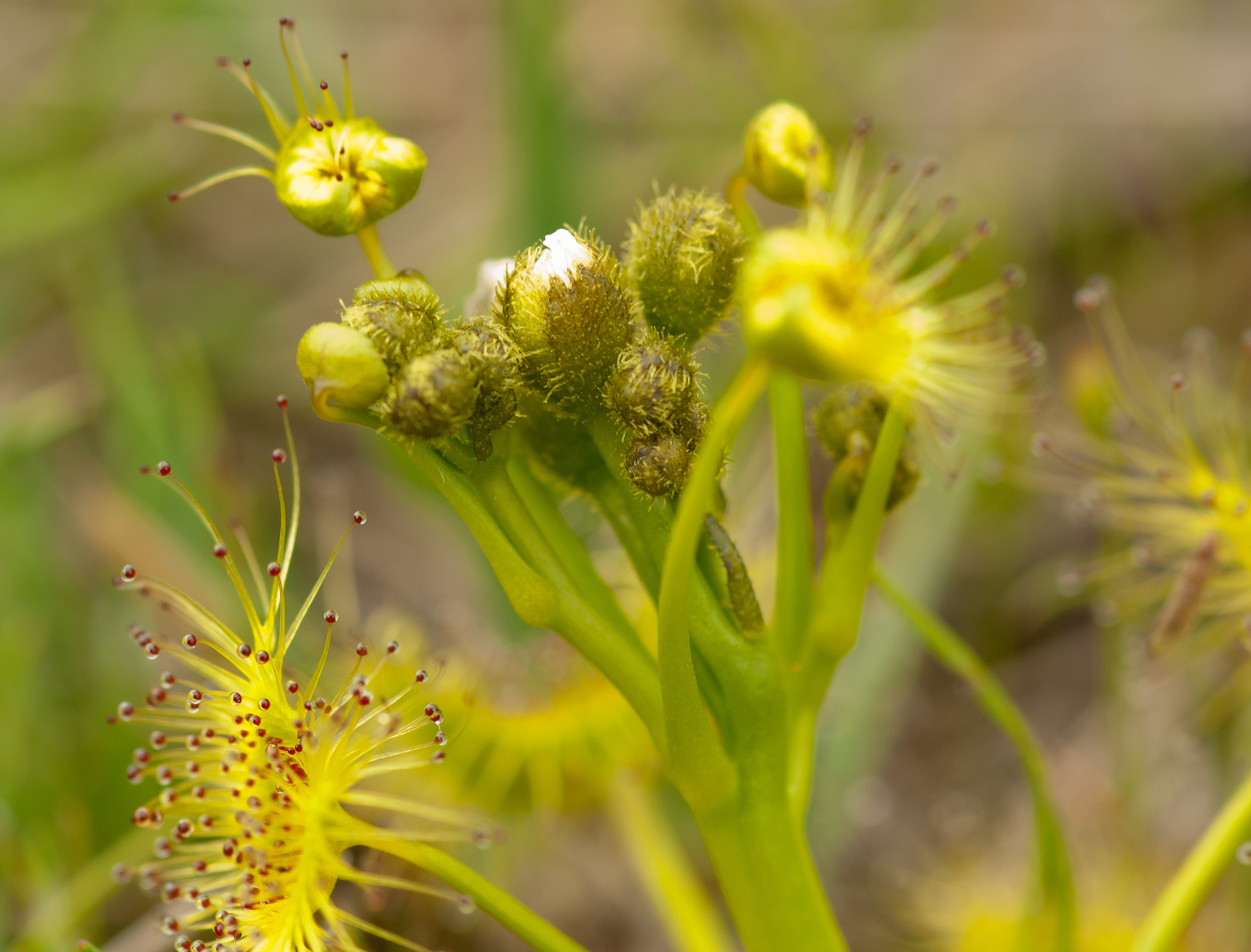
Drosera hookeri flower buds

Drosera hookeri is a perennial tuberous herb. Its underground tuber is white and generally found 2 – 5 cm under the soil surface. Its aerial parts range from 5 – 10 cm in height, normally yellow-green to distinctly yellow in colour. Drosera hookeri has a well-developed rosette of lunate to semi-orbicular leaves at the soil surface, as well as lunate cauline leaves. The aerial stem is normally branched multiple times from the base of the plant. Flowers are white, and can appear very close to the basal leaf rosette. The seeds are black and cylindrical.

== Habitat and distribution ==
Drosera hookeri is typically a plant of winter-wet, summer-dry grasslands and grassy woodlands. It frequently co-occurs with other species in the D. peltata complex.

== See also ==
- List of Drosera species
