= Drosera sulphurea =

Conservation status
- Least Concern (IUCN 3.1)

Scientific classification
- Kingdom: Plantae
- Clade: Tracheophytes
- Clade: Angiosperms
- Clade: Eudicots
- Order: Caryophyllales
- Family: Droseraceae
- Genus: Drosera
- Subgenus: Drosera subg. Ergaleium
- Section: Drosera sect. Ergaleium
- Species: D. sulphurea

Binomial name
- Drosera sulphurea Lehm.

Synonyms
- D. bifida R.Br. ex Diels; D. flava R.Br. ex Diels; D. flavescens R.Br. ex Diels; D. neesii var. sulphurea (Lehm.) Benth.

Species of carnivorous plant

Drosera sulphurea is a species of carnivorous plant in the family Droseraceae. Sometimes referred to by the common name sulphur-flowered sundew, it is a scrambling perennial tuberous species. It is endemic to Western Australia and is found in coastal areas in sandy loam, often among Cephalotus. D. sulphurea produces small, shield-shaped carnivorous leaves along stems that can be 40–60 cm (16–24 in) high. Yellow flowers bloom in September.

== Botanical history ==
Drosera sulphurea was first described by Johann Georg Christian Lehmann in 1844. In 1864, George Bentham reduced the species to a variety of D. neesii. It was then further reduced to synonymy with D. neesii by N. G. Marchant in 1982. Then in 1999 Allen Lowrie, noticing that it was distantly related to D. subhirtella and its allied species, reinstated the species.

== See also ==
- List of Drosera species
