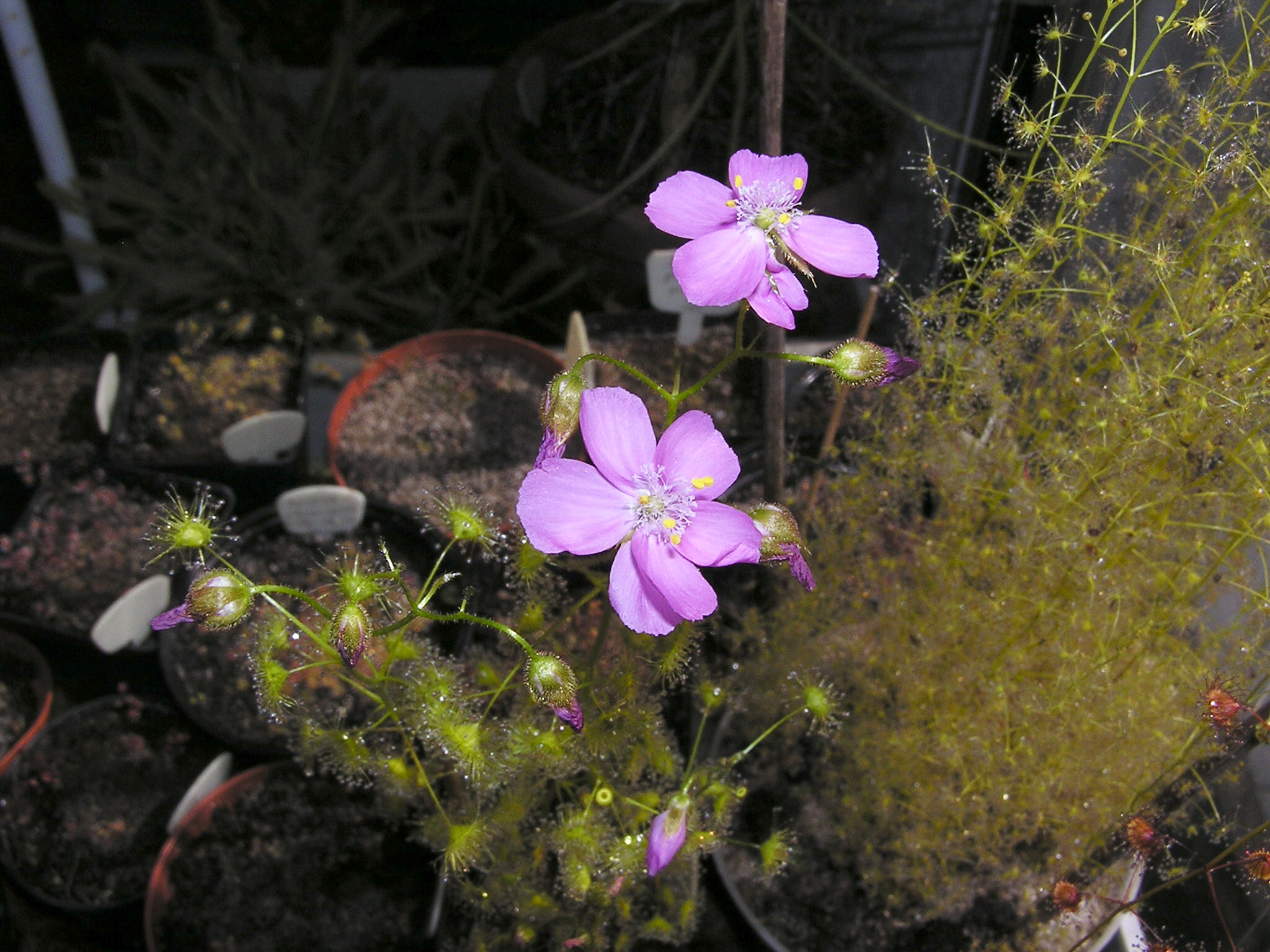

Scientific classification
- Kingdom: Plantae
- Clade: Tracheophytes
- Clade: Angiosperms
- Clade: Eudicots
- Order: Caryophyllales
- Family: Droseraceae
- Genus: Drosera
- Subgenus: Drosera subg. Ergaleium
- Section: Drosera sect. Ergaleium
- Species: D. stricticaulis

Binomial name
- Drosera stricticaulis (Diels) O.H.Sarg.

Synonyms
- D. macrantha var. stricticaulis Diels

= Drosera stricticaulis =

Species of carnivorous plant

Drosera stricticaulis, the erect sundew, is an erect perennial tuberous species in the carnivorous plant genus Drosera.

D. stricticaulis is native to Australia, most commonly found near watercourses and granite outcrops in sandy clay or loam in Western Australia. D. stricticaulis has also been found in parts of South Australia, particularly the lower Eyre Peninsula and atop Dutchmans Stern in the southern Flinders Ranges.

D. stricticaulis produces small, cup-shaped carnivorous leaves along green, glandular stems that can be 25 cm (10 in) high. Pink flowers bloom from July to October.

== Botanical history ==
Drosera stricticaulis was first described by Ludwig Diels in 1906 as a variety of D. macrantha. In 1913, Oswald Hewlett Sargent elevated the variety to species rank. A recently described infraspecific taxon under D. macrantha, D. macrantha subsp. eremaea, was described in 1992 by N. G. Marchant and Allen Lowrie but reclassified as a subspecies of D. stricticaulis in 1996 when Jan Schlauer provided a comprehensive revision and new field key to the genus. Other authorities, such as Western Australia's Department of Environment and Conservation's FloraBase still recognize subspecies eremaea under D. macrantha.

== See also ==
- List of Drosera species
