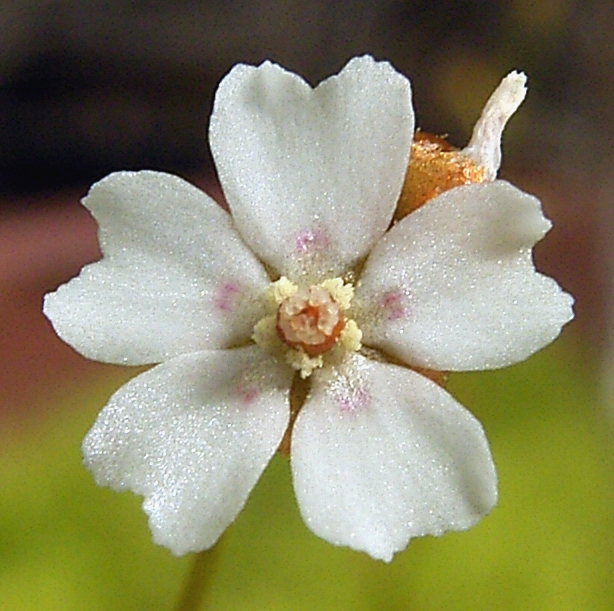

Scientific classification
- Kingdom: Plantae
- Clade: Tracheophytes
- Clade: Angiosperms
- Clade: Eudicots
- Order: Caryophyllales
- Family: Droseraceae
- Genus: Drosera
- Subgenus: Drosera subg. Ergaleium
- Section: Drosera sect. Ergaleium
- Species: D. bicolor

Binomial name
- Drosera bicolor Lowrie & Carlquist

= Drosera bicolor =

Species of carnivorous plant

Drosera bicolor is an erect perennial tuberous species in the genus Drosera that is endemic to Western Australia. It produces a basal rosette of leaves similar to that of D. peltata and the stem grows to 11 cm (4 in) high. Its white flowers that have a red spot near the petal base emerge from September to October. D. bicolor grows in deep silica sand on heathland along the upper Phillips River and south-east of Lake King.

Drosera bicolor was first described by Allen Lowrie and Sherwin Carlquist in 1992. Lowrie notes in his book Carnivorous Plants of Australia that this species is distinct from other related species, including D. peltata and D. salina, by its bicoloured flowers and the arrangement of its petioles and number of flowers. Some, however, consider this species to simply be a variety or synonymous with D. peltata, though this opinion has not been formally published.

== See also ==
- List of Drosera species
