= Drosera neesii =

Conservation status
- Least Concern (IUCN 3.1)

Scientific classification
- Kingdom: Plantae
- Clade: Tracheophytes
- Clade: Angiosperms
- Clade: Eudicots
- Order: Caryophyllales
- Family: Droseraceae
- Genus: Drosera
- Subgenus: Drosera subg. Ergaleium
- Section: Drosera sect. Ergaleium
- Species: D. neesii

Binomial name
- Drosera neesii Lehm.

Subspecies
- D. neesii subsp. borealis N.G.Marchant; D. neesii subsp. neesii

Synonyms
- Sondera neesii (Lehm.) Chrtek & Slavíková; Drosera neesii subsp. borealis N.G.Marchant

Species of carnivorous plant

Drosera neesii, the jewel rainbow is an erect or twining perennial tuberous species in the carnivorous plant genus Drosera. It is endemic to Western Australia and grows near swamps or granite outcrops in sand, clay, or laterite. D. neesii produces small, cup-shaped carnivorous leaves in groups of three along stems that can be 15–60 cm (6–24 in) high. Pink flowers bloom from August to December.

Drosera neesii was first described by Johann Georg Christian Lehmann in 1844. The first infraspecific taxon was described when George Bentham reduced D. sulphurea to a variety, a decision which was later reversed. Then in 1982, N. G. Marchant described a new subspecies, D. neesii subsp. borealis, which is only found in the species' northern range.

== See also ==
- List of Drosera species
