= Drosera marchantii =

Scientific classification
- Kingdom: Plantae
- Clade: Tracheophytes
- Clade: Angiosperms
- Clade: Eudicots
- Order: Caryophyllales
- Family: Droseraceae
- Genus: Drosera
- Subgenus: Drosera subg. Ergaleium
- Section: Drosera sect. Ergaleium
- Species: D. marchantii

Binomial name
- Drosera marchantii DeBuhr

Subspecies
- D. marchantii subsp. marchantii; D. marchantii subsp. prophylla N.G.Marchant & Lowrie

Species of carnivorous plant

Drosera marchantii is an erect perennial tuberous species in the carnivorous plant genus Drosera. It is endemic to Western Australia and grows in a variety of habitats, including swampy areas and hilltops in laterite-silica sand soils. D. marchantii produces small, circular, peltate carnivorous leaves along stiff stems that can be 10–40 cm (4–16 in) high. Its pink flowers emerge from June to October.

Drosera marchantii was first described and named by Larry Eugene DeBuhr in 1975. In 1992, N. G. Marchant and Allen Lowrie published the formal description of D. marchantii subsp. prophylla, a subspecies that is distinguished by its white flowers, smaller height, and numerous bracts (prophylls) on the lower part of the stem. It has only been found in a small area north of Perth and is listed by Western Australia's Department of Environment and Conservation as a priority three poorly known taxon on the Declared Rare and Priority Flora List.

== See also ==
- List of Drosera species
