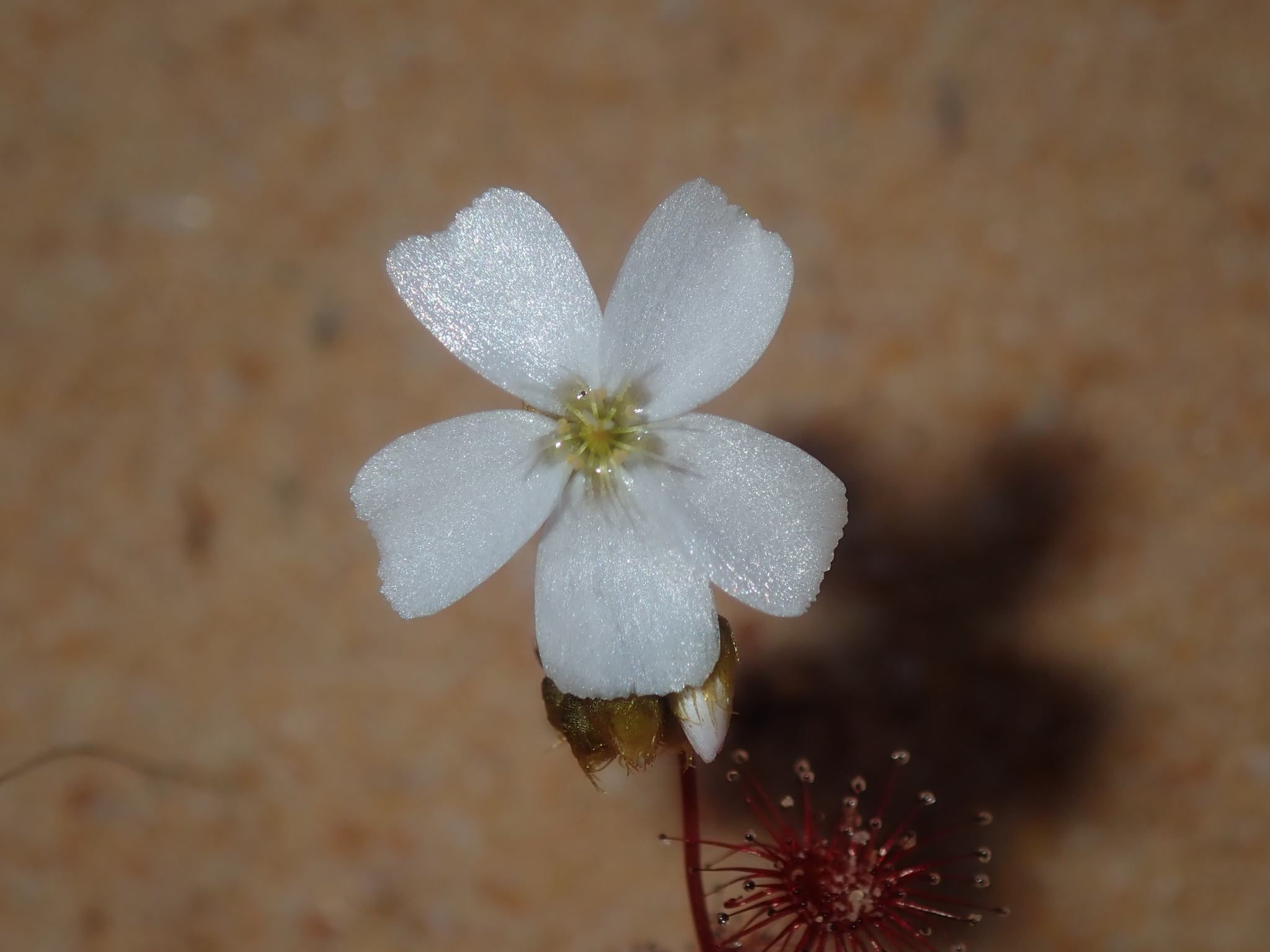

Scientific classification
- Kingdom: Plantae
- Clade: Tracheophytes
- Clade: Angiosperms
- Clade: Eudicots
- Order: Caryophyllales
- Family: Droseraceae
- Genus: Drosera
- Subgenus: Drosera subg. Ergaleium
- Section: Drosera sect. Ergaleium
- Species: D. radicans

Binomial name
- Drosera radicans N.G.Marchant

= Drosera radicans =

Species of carnivorous plant

Drosera radicans is an erect perennial tuberous species in the carnivorous plant genus Drosera. It is endemic to Western Australia and is only found in a relatively small area north of Geraldton. It grows in winter-wet areas in sand or sandy clay soils. D. radicans produces small carnivorous leaves along stems that can be 7–18 cm (3–7 in) high. White flowers bloom from August to September.

Drosera radicans was first described by N. G. Marchant in 1982.

== See also ==
- List of Drosera species
