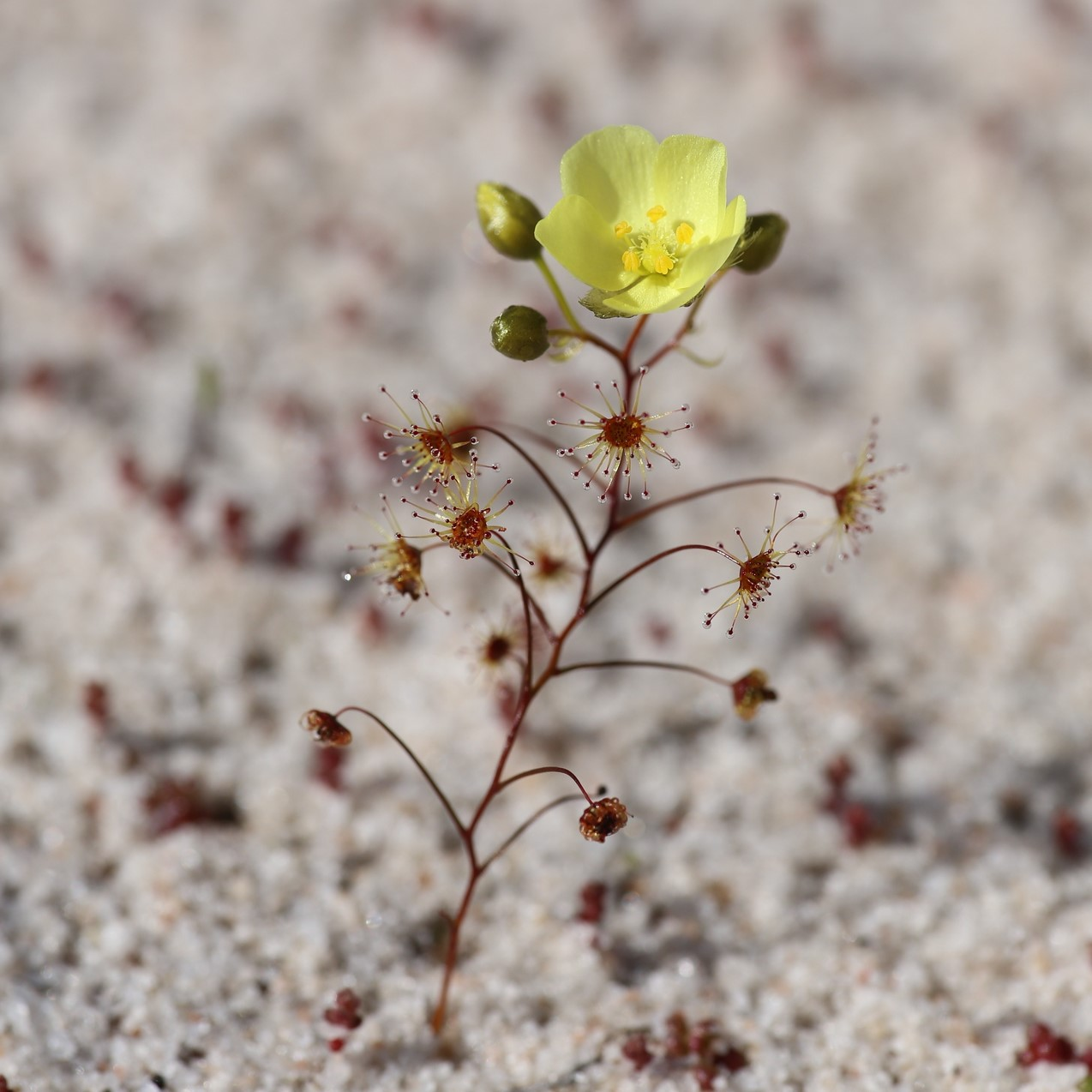

Scientific classification
- Kingdom: Plantae
- Clade: Tracheophytes
- Clade: Angiosperms
- Clade: Eudicots
- Order: Caryophyllales
- Family: Droseraceae
- Genus: Drosera
- Subgenus: Drosera subg. Ergaleium
- Section: Drosera sect. Ergaleium
- Species: D. zigzagia

Binomial name
- Drosera zigzagia Lowrie

Synonyms
- D. huegelii var. flaviflora W.Fitzg. ex Ewart

= Drosera zigzagia =

Species of carnivorous plant

Drosera zigzagia is an erect perennial tuberous species in the carnivorous plant genus Drosera. It is endemic to Western Australia and is found on the margins of salt lakes in brown sandy loam, often associated with D. salina, Stylidium insensitivum, S. pulviniforme, Levenhookia leptantha, and Frankenia species. Drosera zigzagia produces small, solitary carnivorous leaves that alternate along a zigzag stem, which can be 5–7 cm (2.0–2.8 in) high. Yellow flowers are borne on 4–9-flowered inflorescences that bloom from August to September.

Drosera zigzagia was first described by Allen Lowrie in 1999.

== See also ==
- List of Drosera species
