= Drosera moorei =

Scientific classification
- Kingdom: Plantae
- Clade: Tracheophytes
- Clade: Angiosperms
- Clade: Eudicots
- Order: Caryophyllales
- Family: Droseraceae
- Genus: Drosera
- Subgenus: Drosera subg. Ergaleium
- Section: Drosera sect. Ergaleium
- Species: D. moorei

Binomial name
- Drosera moorei (Diels) Lowrie

Synonyms
- D. subhirtella var. moorei Diels; D. subhirtella subsp. moorei (Diels) N.G.Marchant

Species of carnivorous plant

Drosera moorei is a scrambling or climbing perennial tuberous species in the carnivorous plant genus Drosera. It is endemic to Western Australia and grows near granite outcrops in sandy loam. D. moorei produces small, circular, peltate carnivorous leaves along glabrous stems that can be 12–35 cm (5–14 in) long. Inflorescences have two to ten yellow flowers and bloom from September to October.

== Botanical history ==
Drosera moorei was first described as a variety of D. subhirtella by Ludwig Diels in his 1906 monograph on the Droseraceae. In 1982, N. G. Marchant changed the variety to a subspecies and there the taxon stood until Allen Lowrie elevated it to species rank in 1999. It was originally named in honour of Spencer Le Marchant Moore, who worked for the Department of Botany at the British Museum and collected in Western Australia.

== See also ==
- List of Drosera species
