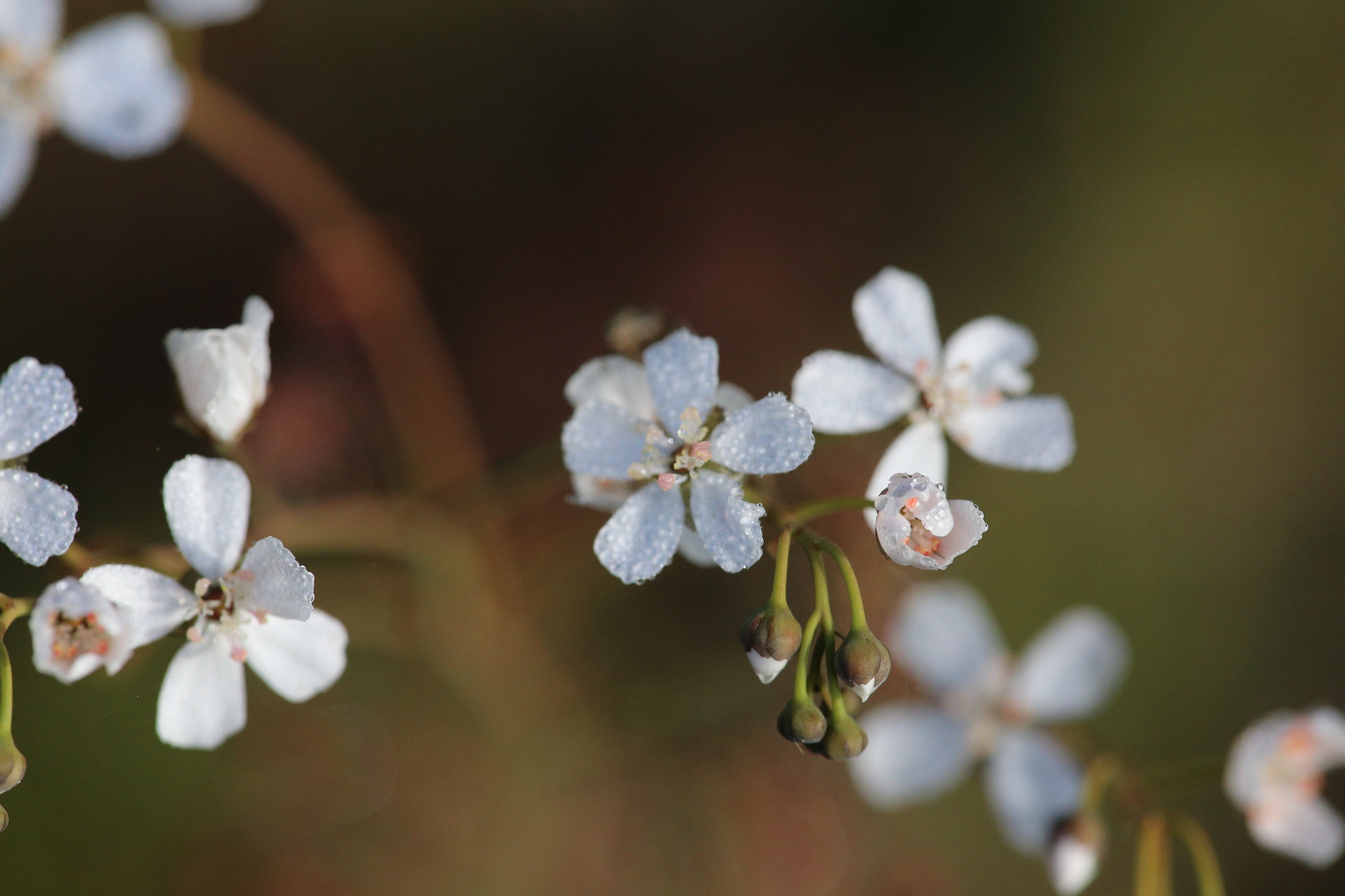

Conservation status
- Priority Four — Rare Taxa (DEC)

Scientific classification
- Kingdom: Plantae
- Clade: Tracheophytes
- Clade: Angiosperms
- Clade: Eudicots
- Order: Caryophyllales
- Family: Droseraceae
- Genus: Drosera
- Subgenus: Drosera subg. Ergaleium
- Section: Drosera sect. Ergaleium
- Species: D. graniticola

Binomial name
- Drosera graniticola N.G.Marchant

= Drosera graniticola =

Species of carnivorous plant

Drosera graniticola is an erect perennial tuberous species in the carnivorous plant genus Drosera that is endemic to Western Australia. It grows 10–20 cm (4–8 in) high near granite outcrops. White flowers emerge from August to September.

D. graniticola was first described and named by N. G. Marchant in 1982.

== See also ==
- List of Drosera species
