= Drosera myriantha =

Scientific classification
- Kingdom: Plantae
- Clade: Tracheophytes
- Clade: Angiosperms
- Clade: Eudicots
- Order: Caryophyllales
- Family: Droseraceae
- Genus: Drosera
- Subgenus: Drosera subg. Ergaleium
- Section: Drosera sect. Ergaleium
- Species: D. myriantha

Binomial name
- Drosera myriantha Planch.

Species of carnivorous plant

Drosera myriantha, the star rainbow or starry sundew, is an erect perennial tuberous species in the carnivorous plant genus Drosera. It is endemic to Western Australia and is found along the coast south of Perth to Albany. It grows in swampy areas in peaty sand soils. D. myriantha produces carnivorous leaves along stems that can be 15–35 cm (6–14 in) high. White or pink flowers bloom from October to December.

Drosera myriantha was first described by Jules Émile Planchon in 1848.

== See also ==
- List of Drosera species
