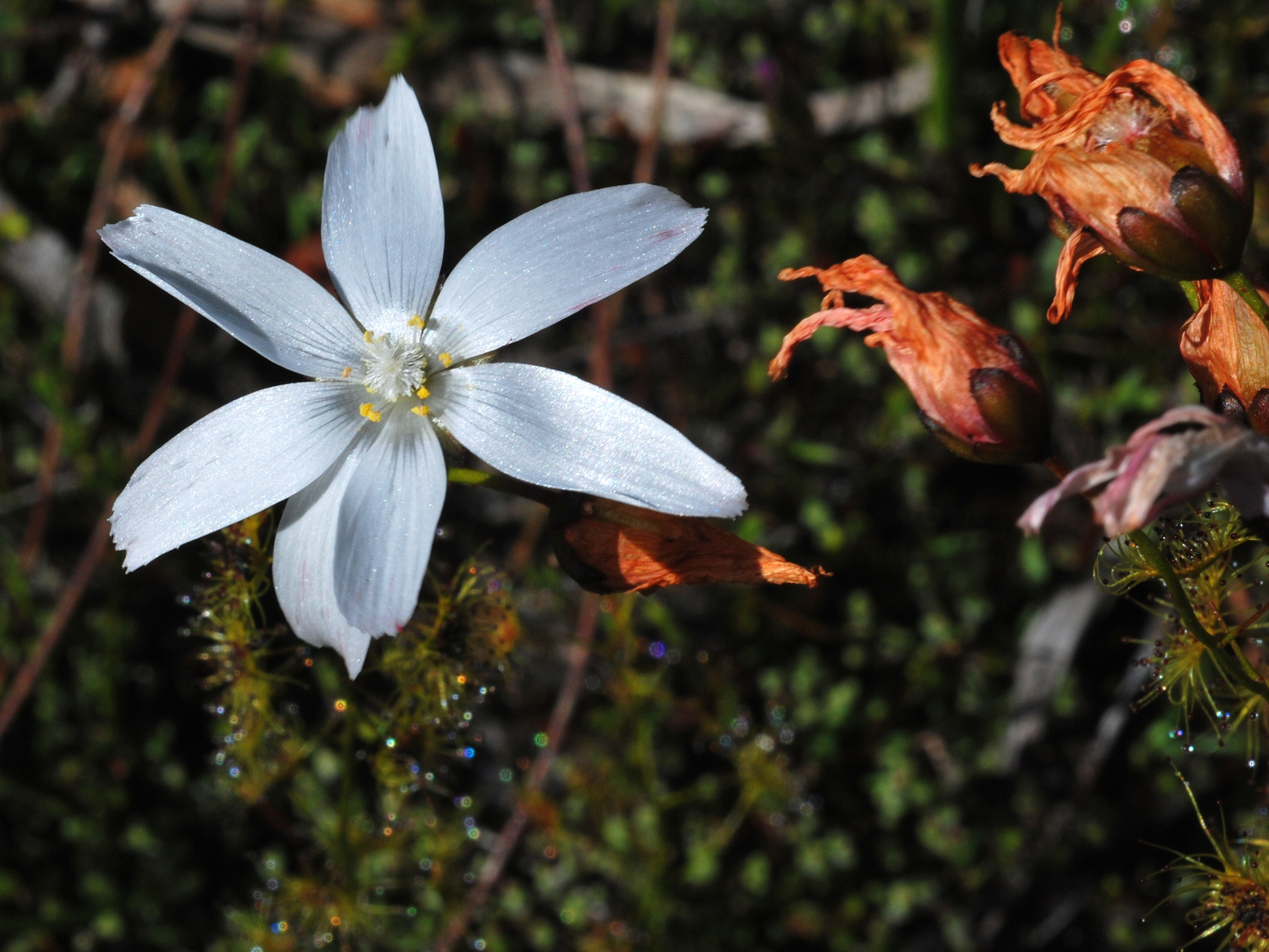

Scientific classification
- Kingdom: Plantae
- Clade: Tracheophytes
- Clade: Angiosperms
- Clade: Eudicots
- Order: Caryophyllales
- Family: Droseraceae
- Genus: Drosera
- Subgenus: Drosera subg. Ergaleium
- Section: Drosera sect. Ergaleium
- Species: D. heterophylla

Binomial name
- Drosera heterophylla Lindl.

Synonyms
- D. preissii (Lehm.) Planch.; Sondera macrantha Lehm.; S. preissii Lehm.

= Drosera heterophylla =

Species of carnivorous plant

Drosera heterophylla, the swamp rainbow, is an erect perennial tuberous species in the carnivorous plant genus Drosera that is endemic to Western Australia. It grows in shallow water swamps or wet clay flats near granite outcrops and occurs in the vicinity of Perth and to its north. D. heterophylla produces small leaves along an erect stem that can be 10–30 cm (4–12 in) tall. It is the only species in the genus that produces many-petaled flowers (as opposed to the usual four- or five-petaled flower). These white flowers emerge from June to September.

Range of D. heterophylla in the wild.

D. heterophylla was first described and named by John Lindley in his 1839 manuscript, A sketch of the vegetation of the Swan River Colony.

== See also ==
- List of Drosera species
