= Drosera microphylla =

- Drosera microphylla (Golden rainbow) at Little Mount Lindesay, Mount Lindesay National Park (WA)

Scientific classification
- Kingdom: Plantae
- Clade: Tracheophytes
- Clade: Angiosperms
- Clade: Eudicots
- Order: Caryophyllales
- Family: Droseraceae
- Genus: Drosera
- Subgenus: Drosera subg. Ergaleium
- Section: Drosera sect. Ergaleium
- Species: D. microphylla

Binomial name
- Drosera microphylla Endl.

Synonyms
- D. calycina Planch.; D. calycina var. minor Benth.; D. microphylla var. macropetala Diels

Species of carnivorous plant

Drosera microphylla, the golden rainbow, is an erect perennial tuberous species in the carnivorous plant genus Drosera. It is endemic to Western Australia and grows on granite outcrops or in sandy or laterite soils. D. microphylla produces small, circular, peltate carnivorous leaves along erect stems that can be 10–40 cm (4–16 in) high. It blooms from June to September, displaying its large golden sepals and smaller, variably-coloured petals. In populations near Perth, the petals are red, whereas petal colour near Albany tends to be orange. Some plants east of Esperance have white petals.

== Botanical history ==
D. microphylla was first described and named by Stephan Endlicher in 1837. In 1848, Jules Émile Planchon described the new species D. calycina, which was later reduced to synonymy with D. microphylla. George Bentham described the new variety D. calycina var. minor in 1864. This taxon was also reduced to a synonym of D. microphylla. Lastly, in his 1906 taxonomic monograph of the family Droseraceae, Ludwig Diels also described a new variety, D. microphylla var. macropetala, which was also later reduced to a synonym.

== See also ==
- List of Drosera species
