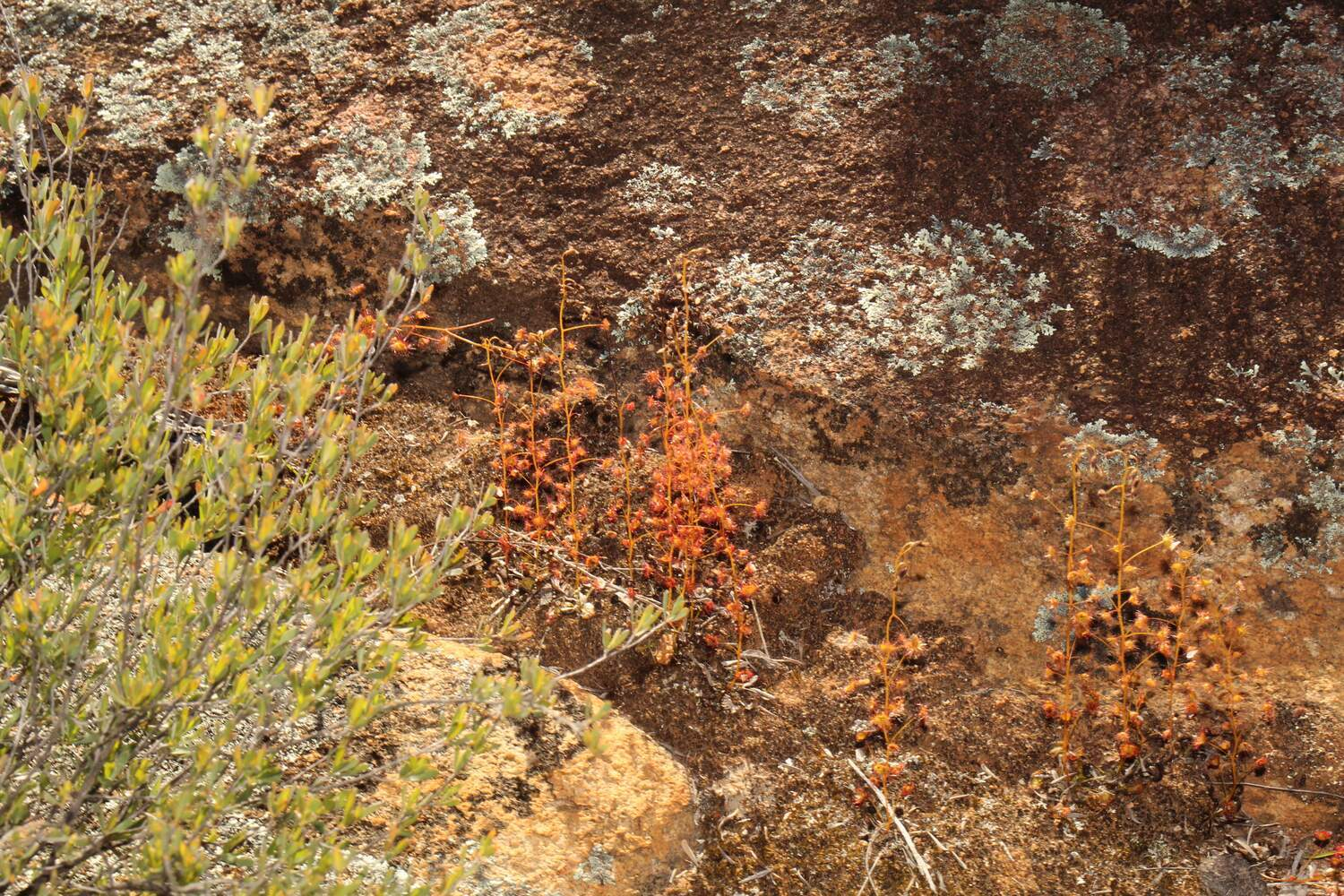

Scientific classification
- Kingdom: Plantae
- Clade: Tracheophytes
- Clade: Angiosperms
- Clade: Eudicots
- Order: Caryophyllales
- Family: Droseraceae
- Genus: Drosera
- Subgenus: Drosera subg. Ergaleium
- Section: Drosera sect. Ergaleium
- Species: D. andersoniana

Binomial name
- Drosera andersoniana W.Fitzg. ex Ewart & Jean White
- Range of D. andersoniana in the wild

= Drosera andersoniana =

Species of carnivorous plant

Drosera andersoniana, the sturdy sundew, is an erect perennial tuberous species in the genus Drosera that is endemic to Western Australia. It produces a basal rosette of leaves similar to that of D. peltata and the stem grows to 8–25 cm (3–10 in). Its pink-white to red flowers emerge from August to September. D. andersoniana grows in loamy soils near granite outcrops.

D. andersoniana was first described and named by William Vincent Fitzgerald but was first validly published by Alfred James Ewart and Jean White-Haney in 1909.

== See also ==
- List of Drosera species
