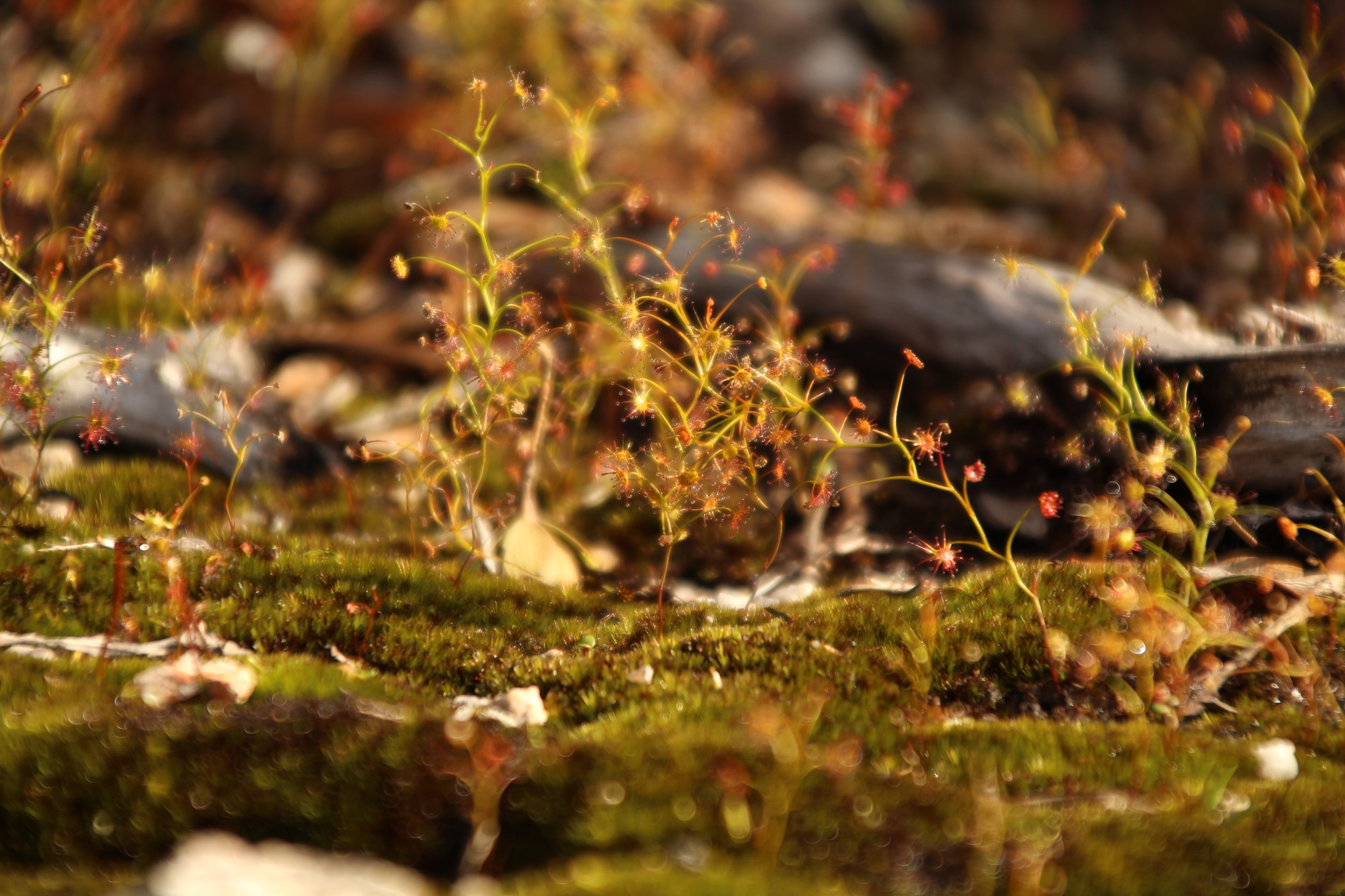

Scientific classification
- Kingdom: Plantae
- Clade: Tracheophytes
- Clade: Angiosperms
- Clade: Eudicots
- Order: Caryophyllales
- Family: Droseraceae
- Genus: Drosera
- Subgenus: Drosera subg. Ergaleium
- Section: Drosera sect. Ergaleium
- Species: D. erythrogyne

Binomial name
- Drosera erythrogyne N.G.Marchant & Lowrie

= Drosera erythrogyne =

Species of carnivorous plant

Drosera erythrogyne is a scrambling or climbing perennial tuberous species in the genus Drosera that is endemic to Western Australia. It grows in soils that are peat-sand to loam and occurs in an area along the southern Western Australian coast west of Albany in swamps or near granite outcrops. It produces small leaves along a long, scrambling stem that can grow to 2–3 m (7–10 ft) long. White flowers emerge from August to October.

D. erythrogyne was first described and named by N. G. Marchant and Allen Lowrie in 1992.

== See also ==
- List of Drosera species
