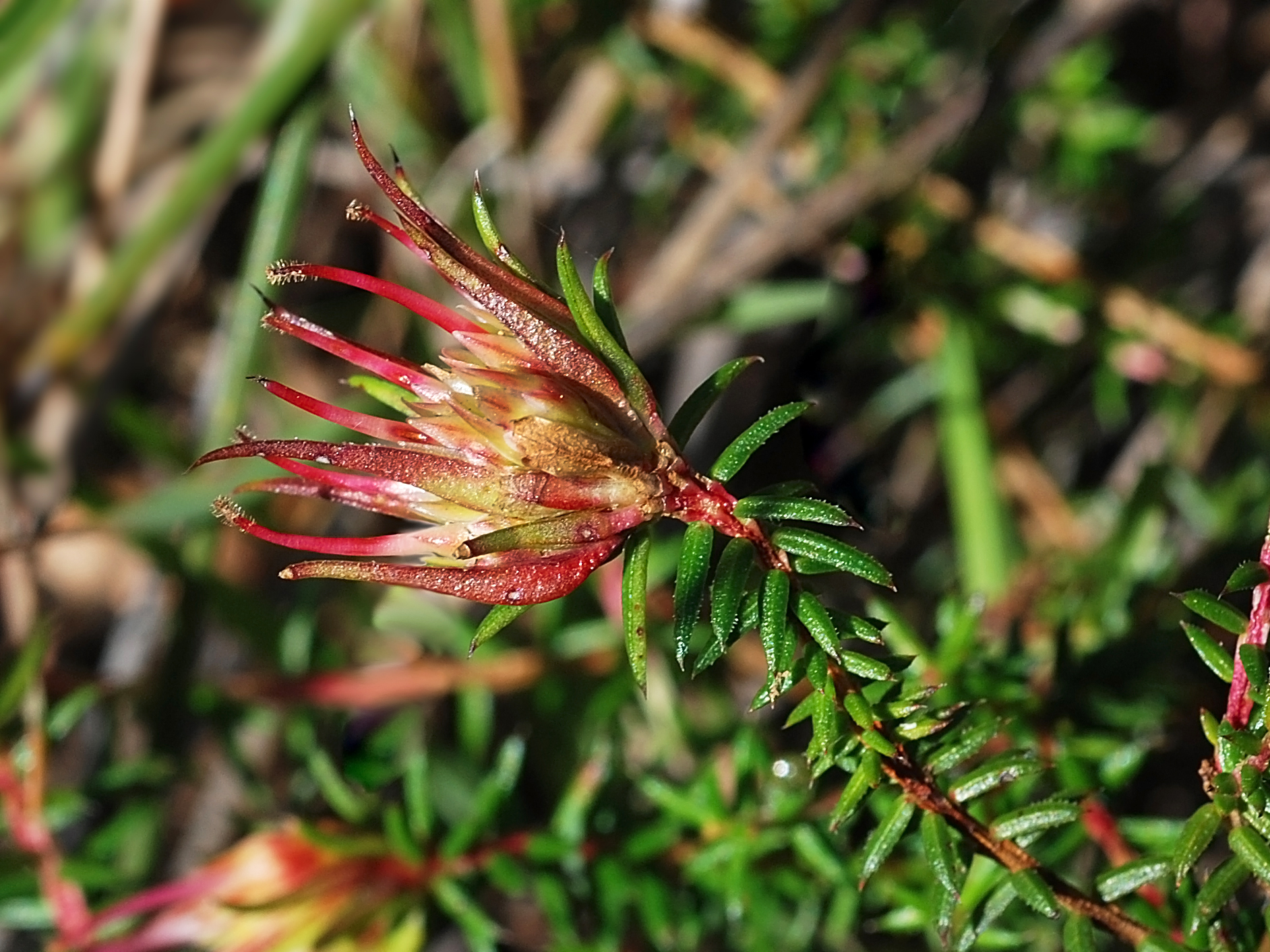
- Darwinia apiculata near Gosnells

Conservation status
- Endangered (EPBC Act)

Scientific classification
- Kingdom: Plantae
- Clade: Tracheophytes
- Clade: Angiosperms
- Clade: Eudicots
- Clade: Rosids
- Order: Myrtales
- Family: Myrtaceae
- Genus: Darwinia
- Species: D. apiculata

Binomial name
- Darwinia apiculata N.G.Marchant

= Darwinia apiculata =

Scarp darwinia

Species of flowering plant

Darwinia apiculata, commonly known as the scarp darwinia, is a plant in the myrtle family Myrtaceae and is endemic to a small area in Western Australia. It is a rounded, densely branched, small shrub with thin red branches and scattered small leaves. The flowers are arranged in small groups on the ends of the branches, their most obvious feature being long, red, pointed bracts surrounding each flower and a longer red style with scattered hairs near its tip.

== Description ==
Scarp darwinia is a densely branched, glabrous, rounded shrub growing to 0.4–0.5 metres (1–2 ft) high. It has thin red branches with the leaf bases having wings that extend down the stems. Its leaves have a petiole less than 0.3 millimetres (0.01 in) long, and a leaf blade 3–7 millimetres (0.1–0.3 in) long, linear in shape and triangular in cross-section. The tip of the leaves is sharply pointed.

The flowers are arranged in groups of 4 to 8 near the ends of the branches. The groups of flowers are surrounded by narrow egg-shaped, pointed bracts up to 15 millimetres (0.6 in) long. The bracts are green, yellowish or yellow and red. The petal lobes are about 3 millimetres (0.1 in) long and 2 millimetres (0.08 in), enclosing the stamens, staminodes and the lower part of the style. The style is red and 6–9 millimetres (0.2–0.4 in) long with scattered hairs near its tip. Flowering occurs during October or November. Fruit rarely forms but is a nut containing one or two seeds.

== Taxonomy ==
The first formal description of D. apiculata was published by Neville Marchant in 1984 in Nuytsia. The specific epithet (apiculata) is a Latin word meaning "small-pointed" alluding to the distinctly pointed leaves.

== Distribution and habitat ==
This darwinia is currently only known from three populations in the Darling Scarp where it grows in jarrah-marri woodland in shallow, gravelly soil or sandy loam over laterite near granite boulders.

== Ecology ==
Scarp darwinia is killed by fire but regenerates from seed stored in the soil. Its pollination mechanism is not known but similar darwinias are pollinated by insects or birds. Some Darwinia species are susceptible to dieback disease caused by Phytophthora cinnamomi, but initial trials suggest that this species may be resistant. The main threats to the remaining populations include too-frequent fires, road and firebreak maintenance, weed invasion, illegal rubbish dumping and mining.

== Conservation ==
Darwinia apiculata is classified as "Threatened Flora (Declared Rare Flora — Extant)" by the Western Australian Government Department of Parks and Wildlife and an Interim Recovery Plan has been prepared. It has also been listed as "Endangered" (EN) under the Australian Government Environment Protection and Biodiversity Conservation Act 1999 (EPBC Act) "due to the severe fragmentation of populations and continuing decline in the number of mature individuals."
