= Drosera subhirtella =

Scientific classification
- Kingdom: Plantae
- Clade: Tracheophytes
- Clade: Angiosperms
- Clade: Eudicots
- Order: Caryophyllales
- Family: Droseraceae
- Genus: Drosera
- Subgenus: Drosera subg. Ergaleium
- Section: Drosera sect. Ergaleium
- Species: D. subhirtella

Binomial name
- Drosera subhirtella Planch.

Species of carnivorous plant

Drosera subhirtella, the sunny rainbow, is a scrambling or climbing perennial tuberous species in the carnivorous plant genus Drosera. It is endemic to Western Australia and is found in sandplains, granite outcrops, and swamp margins in sand, clay, and loam soils. D. subhirtella produces small carnivorous leaves along stems that can be 40 cm (16 in) high. Yellow flowers bloom from August to October.

== Botanical history ==
Drosera subhirtella was first described by Jules Émile Planchon in 1848. A new variety of D. subhirtella, var. moorei, was described by Ludwig Diels in his 1906 monograph on the Droseraceae. In 1982, N. G. Marchant changed the variety to a subspecies and there the taxon stood until Allen Lowrie elevated it to species rank at D. moorei in 1999.

== See also ==
- List of Drosera species
