= Drosera modesta =

Scientific classification
- Kingdom: Plantae
- Clade: Tracheophytes
- Clade: Angiosperms
- Clade: Eudicots
- Order: Caryophyllales
- Family: Droseraceae
- Genus: Drosera
- Subgenus: Drosera subg. Ergaleium
- Section: Drosera sect. Ergaleium
- Species: D. modesta

Binomial name
- Drosera modesta Diels

Species of carnivorous plant

Drosera modesta, the modest rainbow, is a scrambling perennial tuberous species in the carnivorous plant genus Drosera. It is endemic to Western Australia and grows on granite outcrops or stream banks in laterite or sand-clay soils. D. modesta produces shield-shaped carnivorous leaves with longer than normal tentacles. The scrambling stems can be 0.3–0.8 m (1.0–2.6 ft) long. White flowers bloom from October to November.

Drosera modesta was first described and named by Ludwig Diels in 1904.

== See also ==
- List of Drosera species
