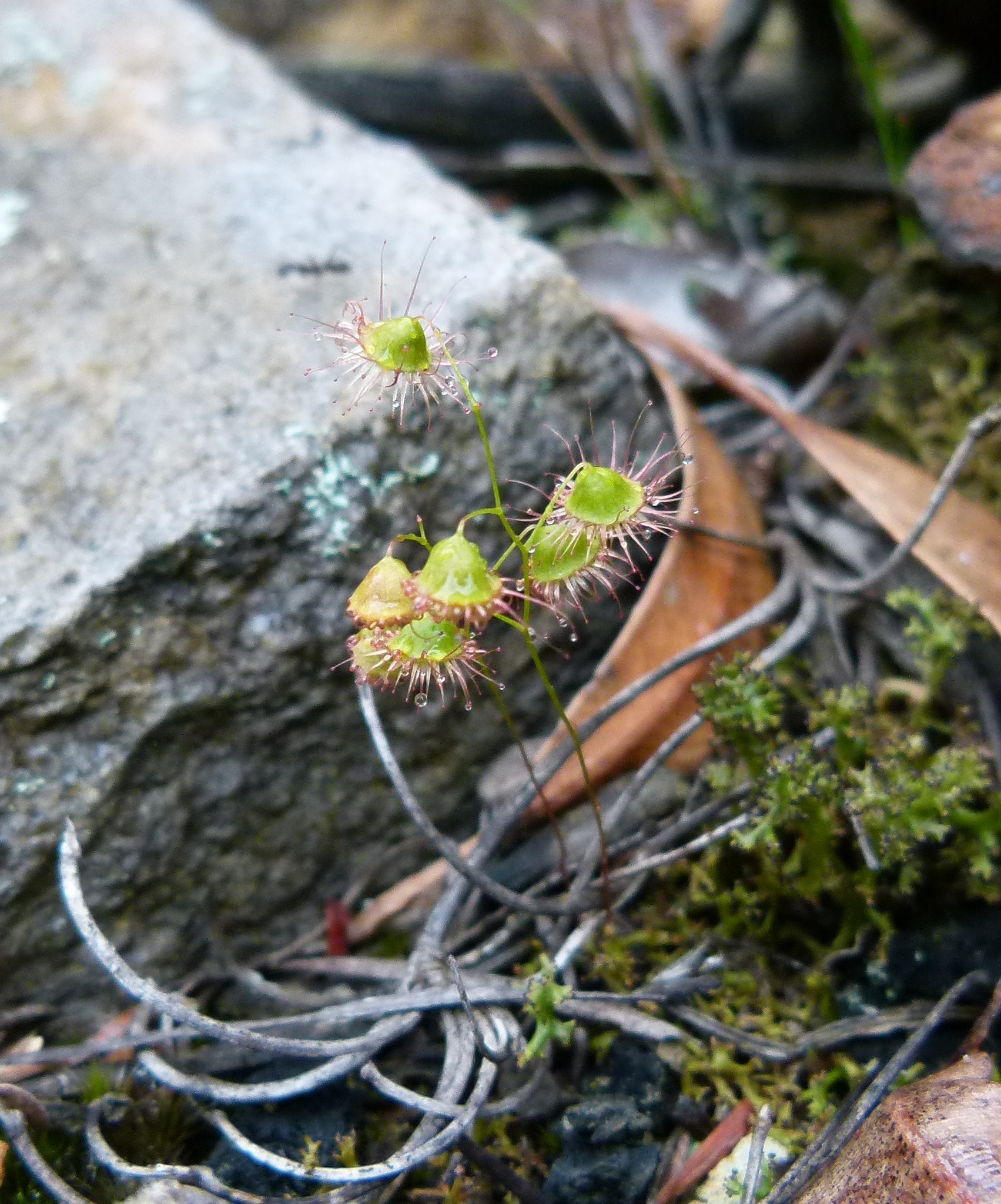

Scientific classification
- Kingdom: Plantae
- Clade: Tracheophytes
- Clade: Angiosperms
- Clade: Eudicots
- Order: Caryophyllales
- Family: Droseraceae
- Genus: Drosera
- Subgenus: Drosera subg. Ergaleium
- Section: Drosera sect. Ergaleium
- Species: D. huegelii

Binomial name
- Drosera huegelii Endl.
- Range of D. huegelii in the wild

Synonyms
- D. filipes Turcz.

= Drosera huegelii =

Species of carnivorous plant

Drosera huegelii, the bold sundew, is an erect perennial tuberous species in the carnivorous plant genus Drosera that is endemic to Western Australia. It grows in sandy soils in winter-wet depressions and margins of swamps and occurs along the south-west coast of Australia. D. huegelii produces small, bell-shaped leaves along an erect stem that can be 10–50 cm (4–20 in) tall. White to cream-coloured flowers emerge from June to September.

D. huegelii was first described and named by Stephan Endlicher in his 1837 publication Enumeratio plantarum.

== See also ==
- List of Drosera species
