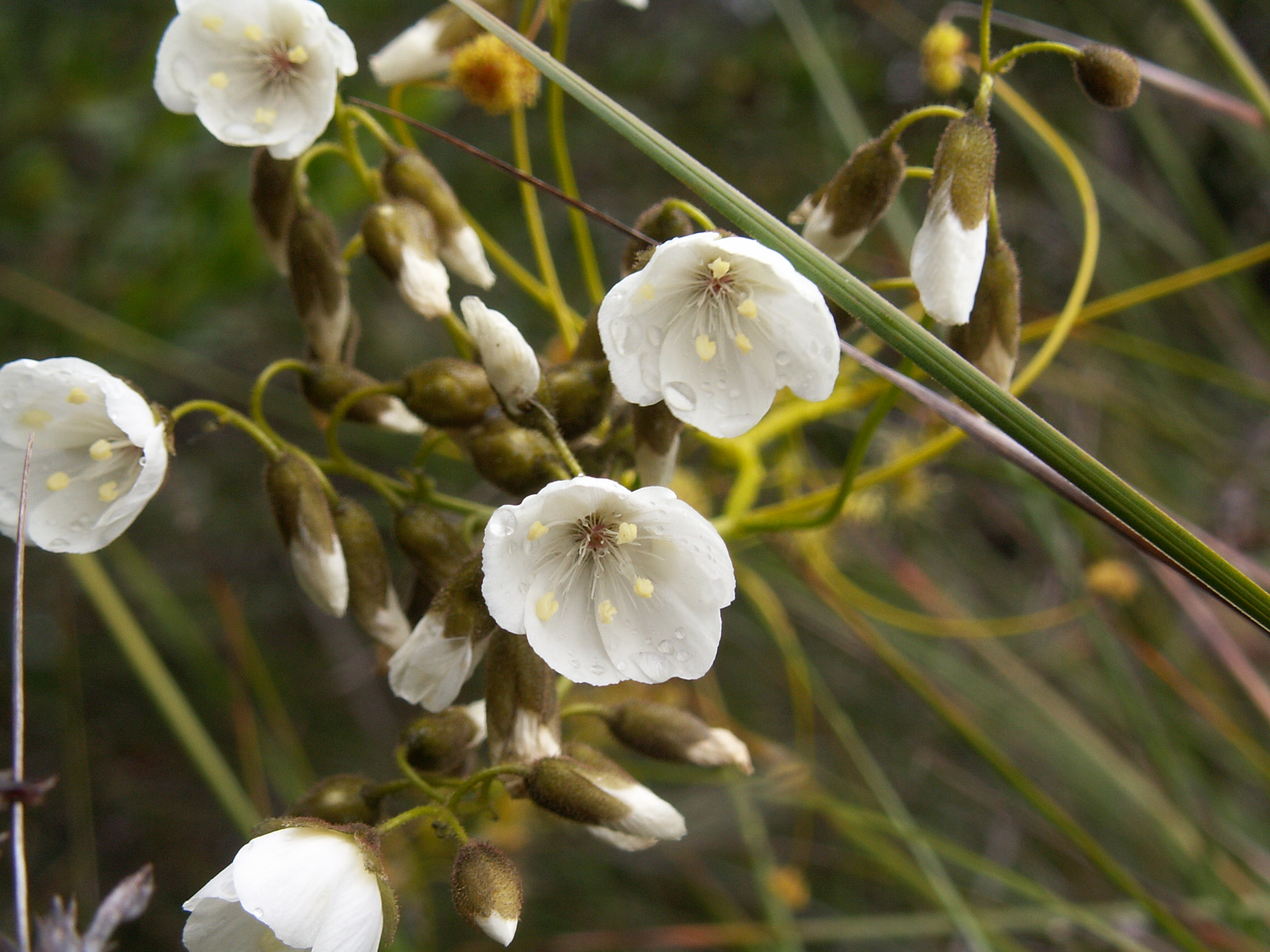
- D. pallida near Albany, Western Australia

Scientific classification
- Kingdom: Plantae
- Clade: Tracheophytes
- Clade: Angiosperms
- Clade: Eudicots
- Order: Caryophyllales
- Family: Droseraceae
- Genus: Drosera
- Subgenus: Drosera subg. Ergaleium
- Section: Drosera sect. Ergaleium
- Species: D. pallida

Binomial name
- Drosera pallida Lindl.

= Drosera pallida =

Species of carnivorous plant

Drosera pallida, the pale rainbow, is a climbing or scrambling perennial tuberous species in the carnivorous plant genus Drosera. It is endemic to Western Australia and grows on sandplains, heathland, or near coastal plain lakes in deep sand or laterite. D. pallida produces small carnivorous leaves in groups of three along stems that can be 0.3–1.8 m (1.0–5.9 ft) high. White flowers bloom from July to November.

Drosera pallida was first described by John Lindley in his 1839 work, A sketch of the vegetation of the Swan River Colony.

== See also ==
- List of Drosera species
