= Drosera intricata =

Scientific classification
- Kingdom: Plantae
- Clade: Tracheophytes
- Clade: Angiosperms
- Clade: Eudicots
- Order: Caryophyllales
- Family: Droseraceae
- Genus: Drosera
- Subgenus: Drosera subg. Ergaleium
- Section: Drosera sect. Ergaleium
- Species: D. intricata

Binomial name
- Drosera intricata Planch.

Species of carnivorous plant

Drosera intricata is a scrambling or climbing perennial tuberous species in the carnivorous plant genus Drosera that is endemic to Western Australia. It grows in clay-sand soils on swamp margins, or other habitats that are seasonally wet. D. intricata produces small carnivorous leaves along a glabrous stem that can be 25–40 cm (10–16 in) tall. Its 3-12 yellow flowers emerge from September to October. It gains its species name, intricata, from its twining or winding habit.

Drosera intricata was first described and named by Jules Émile Planchon in 1848.

== See also ==
- List of Drosera species
