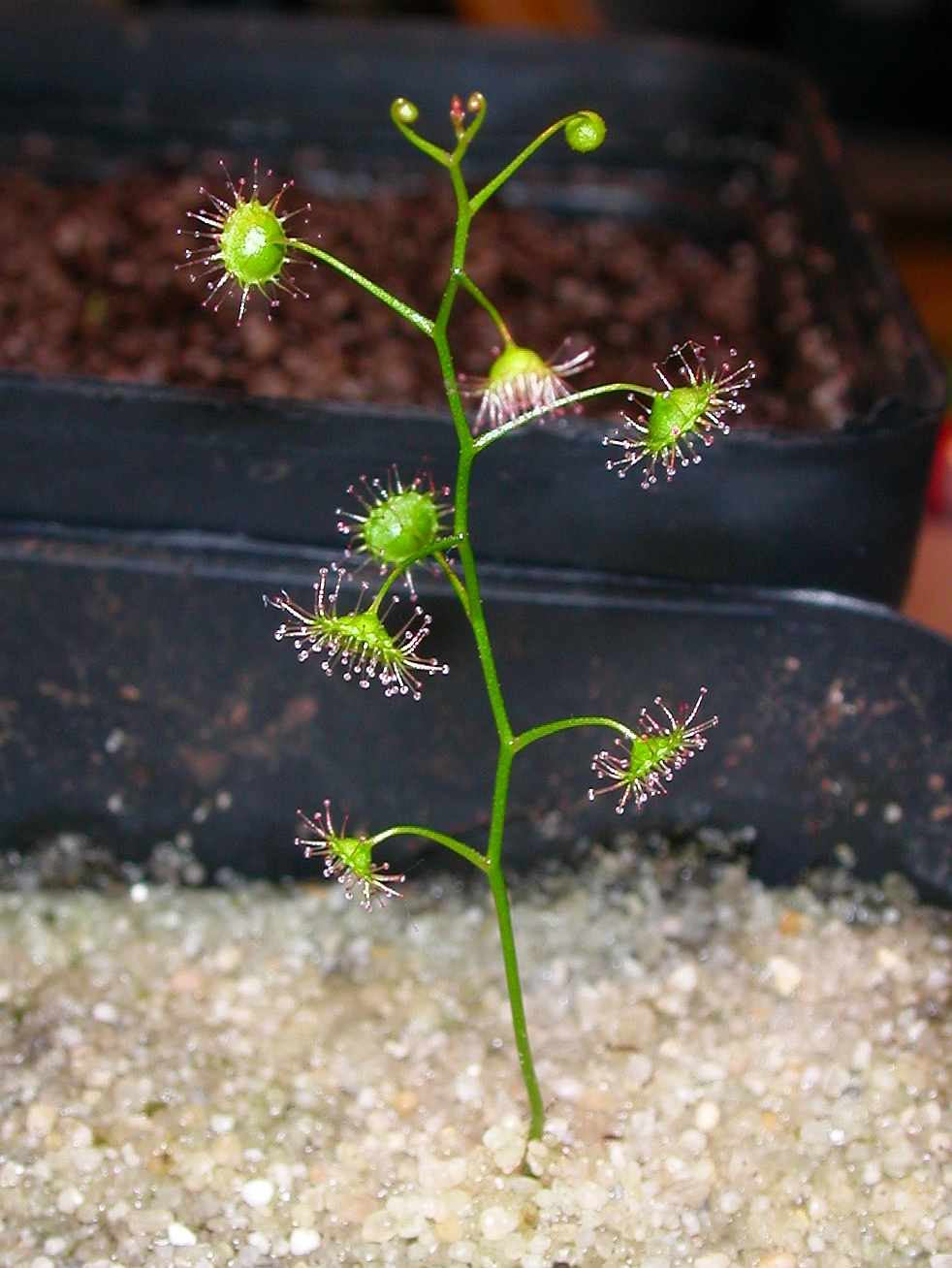
- Drosera menziesii

Scientific classification
- Kingdom: Plantae
- Clade: Tracheophytes
- Clade: Angiosperms
- Clade: Eudicots
- Order: Caryophyllales
- Family: Droseraceae
- Genus: Drosera
- Subgenus: Drosera subg. Ergaleium
- Section: Drosera sect. Ergaleium (DC.) Planch.

Type species
- D. menziesii R.Br. ex DC.

Species
- See text

Synonyms
- D. sect. Polypeltes Diels

= Drosera sect. Ergaleium =

Group of carnivorous plants

Drosera sect. Ergaleium is a section of 26 species that are erect or scrambling tuberous plants in the genus Drosera. This section represents a natural group and are taxonomically monophyletic.

The section description has its origins in the description of Drosera subg. Ergaleium, first formally described by Augustin Pyramus de Candolle in 1824. In 1848, Jules Émile Planchon reorganized the species into sections, series, and subseries. Ludwig Diels reclassified the genus in his 1906 monograph of the family, placing the erect and scrambling tuberous Drosera in section Polypeltes. Another reclassification occurred in 1977, when Larry Eugene DeBuhr corrected Diels' section name to the correct and older autonym, sect. Ergaleium.

== Taxa ==
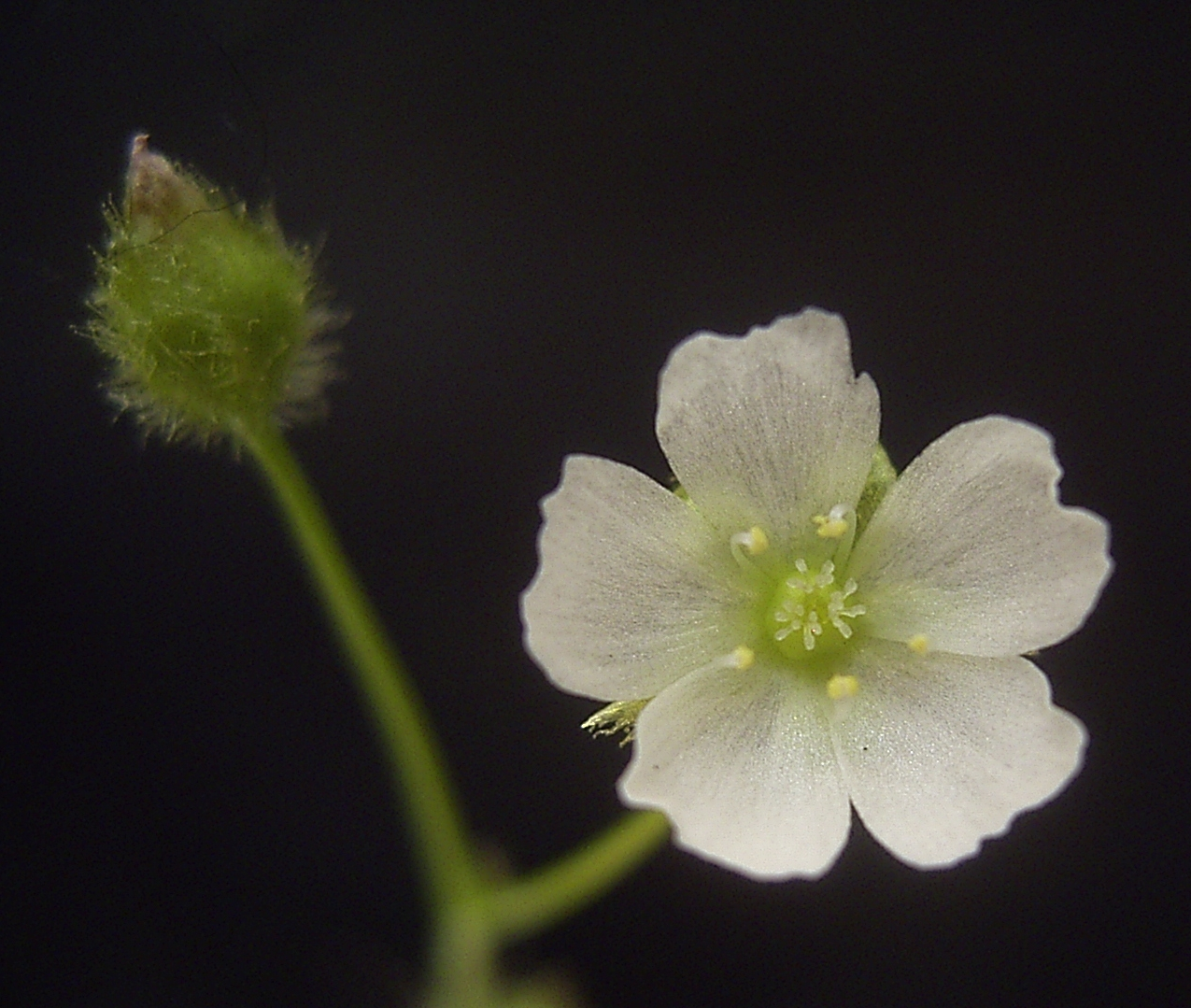
Drosera peltata flower

- Drosera andersoniana W.Fitzg. ex Ewart & Jean White
- Drosera bicolor Lowrie & Carlquist
- Drosera bulbigena Morrison
- Drosera erythrogyne N.G.Marchant & Lowrie
- Drosera gigantea Lindl.
  - D. gigantea subsp. geniculata N.G.Marchant & Lowrie
  - D. gigantea subsp. gigantea Lindl.
- Drosera graniticola N.G.Marchant
- Drosera heterophylla Lindl.
- Drosera huegelii Endl.
- Drosera intricata Planch.
- Drosera macrantha Endl.
  - D. macrantha subsp. eremaea N.G.Marchant & Lowrie
  - D. macrantha subsp. macrantha Endl.
- Drosera marchantii DeBuhr
  - D. marchantii subsp. marchantii DeBuhr
  - D. marchantii subsp. prophylla N.G.Marchant & Lowrie
- Drosera menziesii R.Br. ex DC.
  - D. menziesii subsp. basifolia N.G.Marchant & Lowrie
  - D. menziesii subsp. menziesii R.Br. ex DC.
  - D. menziesii subsp. penicillaris (Benth.) N.G.Marchant & Lowrie
  - D. menziesii subsp. thysanosepala (Diels) N.G.Marchant
- Drosera microphylla Endl.
- Drosera modesta Diels
- Drosera moorei (Diels) Lowrie
- Drosera myriantha Planch.
- Drosera neesii Lehm.
  - D. neesii subsp. borealis N.G.Marchant
  - D. neesii subsp. neesii Lehm.
- Drosera pallida Lindl.
- Drosera peltata Thunb.
  - D. peltata subsp. auriculata (Backh. ex Planch.) B.J.Conn
  - D. peltata subsp. peltata Thunb.
- Drosera radicans N.G.Marchant
- Drosera salina N.G.Marchant & Lowrie
- Drosera stricticaulis (Diels) O.H.Sarg.
- Drosera subhirtella Planch.
- Drosera subtilis N.G.Marchant
- Drosera sulphurea Lehm.
- Drosera zigzagia Lowrie

== See also ==
- List of Drosera species
