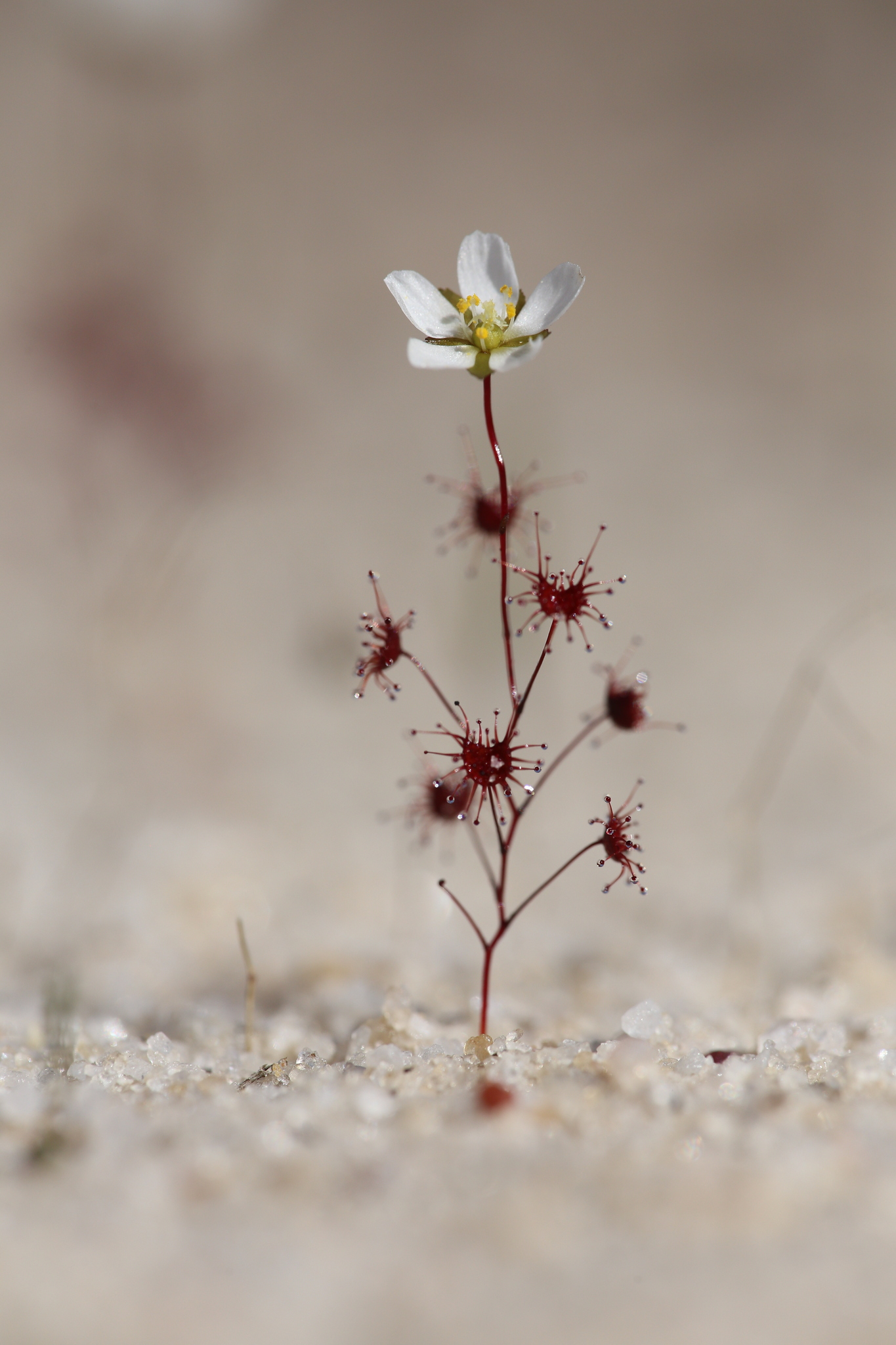

Conservation status
- Priority Two — Poorly Known Taxa (DEC)

Scientific classification
- Kingdom: Plantae
- Clade: Tracheophytes
- Clade: Angiosperms
- Clade: Eudicots
- Order: Caryophyllales
- Family: Droseraceae
- Genus: Drosera
- Subgenus: Drosera subg. Ergaleium
- Section: Drosera sect. Ergaleium
- Species: D. salina

Binomial name
- Drosera salina N.G.Marchant & Lowrie

= Drosera salina =

Species of carnivorous plant

Drosera salina is an erect perennial tuberous species in the carnivorous plant genus Drosera. It is endemic to Western Australia and is only found in salt-free sand on the margins of salt lakes in a few locations north of Albany east to north-west of Esperance. The specific epithet, salina, refers to the salt lake margins that this species inhabits. D. salina produces small carnivorous leaves along stems that can be 7 cm (3 in) high. White flowers bloom from July to September.

Drosera salina was first described by N. G. Marchant and Allen Lowrie in 1992. It is listed by Western Australia's Department of Environment and Conservation as a priority two poorly known taxon on the Declared Rare and Priority Flora List.

== See also ==
- List of Drosera species
