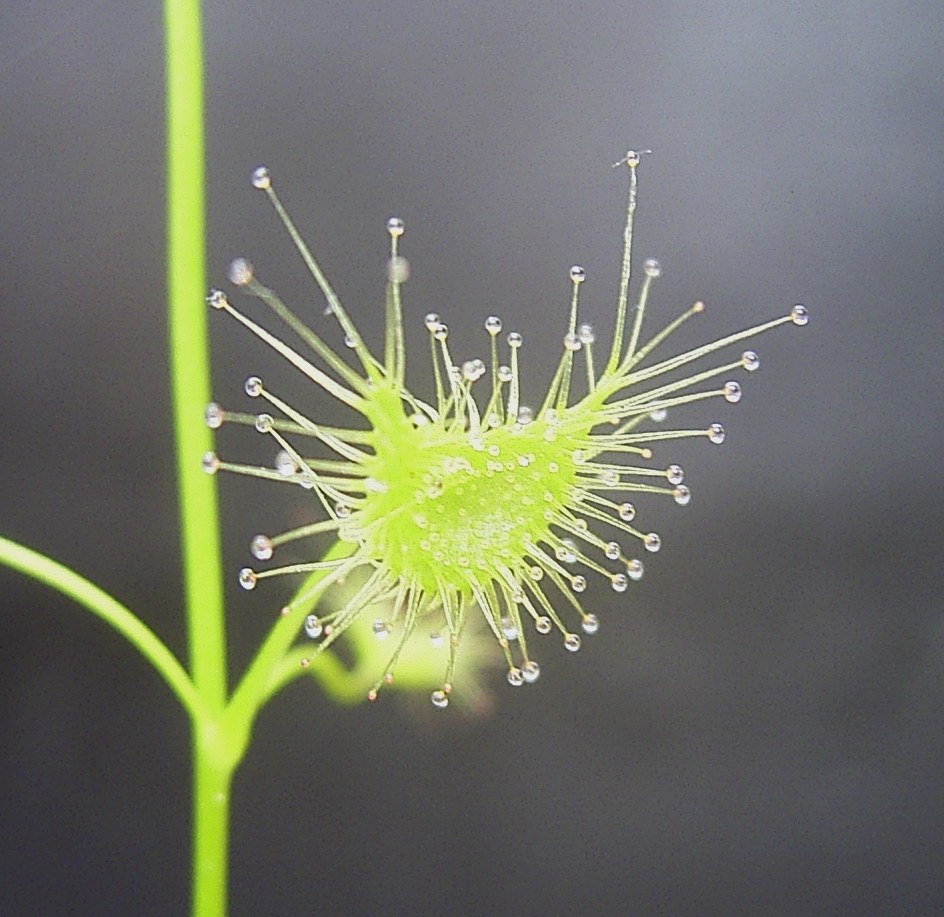

Scientific classification
- Kingdom: Plantae
- Clade: Embryophytes
- Clade: Tracheophytes
- Clade: Spermatophytes
- Clade: Angiosperms
- Clade: Eudicots
- Order: Caryophyllales
- Family: Droseraceae
- Genus: Drosera
- Subgenus: Drosera subg. Ergaleium
- Section: Drosera sect. Ergaleium
- Species: D. peltata

Binomial name
- Drosera peltata Thunb.

Subspecies
- D. peltata subsp. auriculata (Backh. ex Planch.) B.J.Conn; D. peltata subsp. peltata

Synonyms
- D. foliosa Planch.; D. gracilis Hook.f. ex Planch.; D. lobbiana Turcz.; D. lunata Buch.-Ham. ex DC.; D. muscipula Royle; D. nipponica Masam.; D. peltata subsp. gracilis (Hook.f. ex Planch.) Hort.Westphal; D. peltata var. foliosa (Planch.) Benth.; D. peltata var. genuina Planch.; D. peltata var. glabrata Y.Z.Ruan; D. peltata var. gracilis (Hook.f. ex Planch.) Benth.; D. peltata var. gunniana Planch.; D. peltata var. lunata (Buch.-Ham. ex DC.) C.B.Clarke; D. peltata var. multisepala Y.Z.Ruan; D. peltata var. nipponica (Masam.) Ohwi; D. peltata var. typica C.B.Clarke

= Drosera peltata =

Shield sundew

Species of carnivorous plant

Drosera peltata, commonly called the shield sundew or pale sundew, is a climbing or scrambling perennial tuberous species in the carnivorous plant genus Drosera. Among the tuberous sundews, D. peltata has the largest distribution, which includes eastern and western Australia, New Zealand, India, and most of Southeast Asia including the Philippines. The specific epithet is Latin for "shield shaped", a reference to the shape of the cauline leaves. It is either a single extremely variable species, or a complex of several closely related species of uncertain taxonomic boundaries. In Australia at least four forms have had or still have specific taxonomic recognition: Drosera peltata subsp. peltata (an autonym), D. peltata subsp. auriculata, D. foliosa (also as D. peltata var. foliosa) and D. gracilis (also as D. peltata var. gracilis).

Tuberous sundews are species of the genus Drosera that have evolved to live in summer drought conditions and aestivate as a dormant underground tuber. While many tuberous sundews are ground-hugging rosettes, D. peltata is an upright species with a simple or branching inflorescence.

== Description ==
Drosera peltata is a perennial tuberous herb. Its underground tuber is generally found 4 – 6 cm under the soil surface, and its aerial parts range from 5 – 50 cm in height, with wide differentiation into several forms. The subspecies D. peltata subsp. auriculata is often the most robust, reaching up to 50 cm in height, whereas the form known informally as D. foliosa tends to be the shortest, often only 5–10 cm. Drosera peltata generally has an evident rosette of leaves at the soil surface, which is most pronounced in D. foliosa and in contrast often reduced to scales in mature plants of D. peltata subsp. auriculata. The aerial stem is simple or slightly branched in the nominal form of D. peltata, as well as in D. peltata subsp. auriculata, and the form informally known as D. gracilis. Flowers are variable in color, but generally white or light pink. The colour of the plants is also highly variable, with D. foliosa generally bright grass green even when growing in direct sunlight, D. peltata subsp. auriculata often tinged with variable amounts of red (or even solid red), and D. gracilis always orange or dark red colour.

== Habitat and distribution ==
Drosera peltata is commonly found growing on frost free open flats with light scrub, in areas of regenerating forest, on grassy verges and roadside cuttings. The soil type these plants are found in is mainly soft fine clay or peaty, sand soils, which, while wet in winter, dry out over summer. This species has a large range and various forms occur naturally in southern, eastern and south-west Australia, Tasmania, New Zealand (in Northland) as well as south-east Asia and India.

== Taxonomy ==
Drosera peltata was first described by Carl Peter Thunberg in 1797. Due to its large range and varied habit, D. peltata has accumulated a number of synonyms and infraspecific taxa, including varieties and subspecies. Most subspecies have been reduced to synonymy, but the two taxa that are still considered valid are D. peltata subsp. peltata, which is an autonym, and D. peltata subsp. auriculata, which was originally named by James Backhouse and formally described by Jules Émile Planchon in 1848 as D. auriculata and later reduced to a subspecies of D. peltata by Barry John Conn in 1981. Subspecies auriculata is still considered a valid and separate species by some authorities. The major difference between the subspecies involve seed shape and sepal pubescence. D. peltata subsp. peltata has ovate (egg-shaped) seeds and the sepals are hairy or pubescent, whereas D. peltata subsp. auriculata has linear seeds and glabrous sepals.

Although demoted to synonyms of D. peltata by Marchant in 1982, the formerly recognised species Drosera foliosa and Drosera gracilis are again treated as separate species by the Tasmanian Herbarium and the Australian Plant Name Index.

Drosera foliosa differs from the nominal form of D. peltata in having a well-defined basal rosette of large, light green lunate leaves, and multi-branched shorter stems. By contrast the nominal form of D. peltata has a less prominent basal rosette, and a single stem. It is mostly restricted to grasslands, herbfields and open woodland with grassy understorey.

Drosera gracilis is similar to the nominal form of D. peltata but smaller and with distinctly red stems and leaves. In Tasmania it is restricted to wet peaty areas, and unlike the winter and spring growers D. peltata and D. foliosa, it grows in late spring and late into the summer.

== Cultivation ==
Drosera peltata is one of the easiest tuberous Drosera to cultivate, a characteristic that is attributed to its forgiving nature when it comes to water and temperature. The tuberous Drosera typically require wet, cool winters, which is their active growing season, and warmer, nearly bone-dry summers or the dormant tubers will rot. Drosera peltata can withstand wetter summers.

== Gallery ==
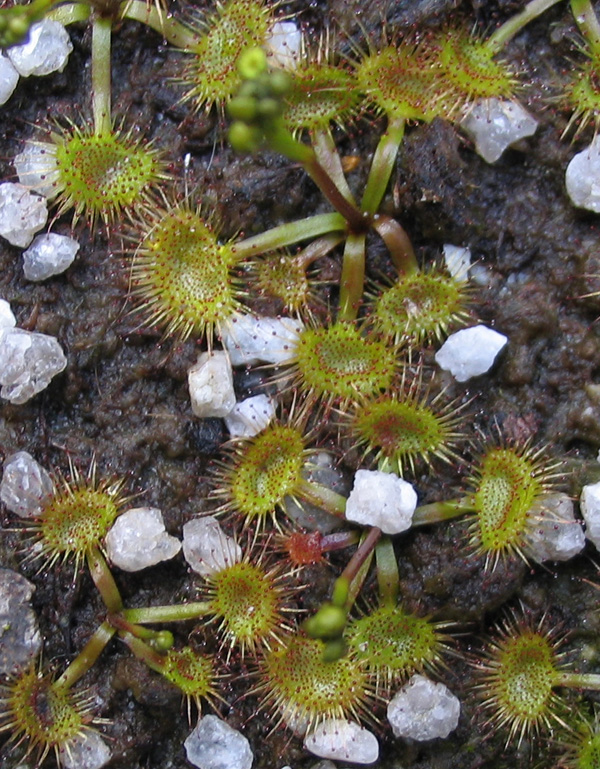
Typical form, basal rosette

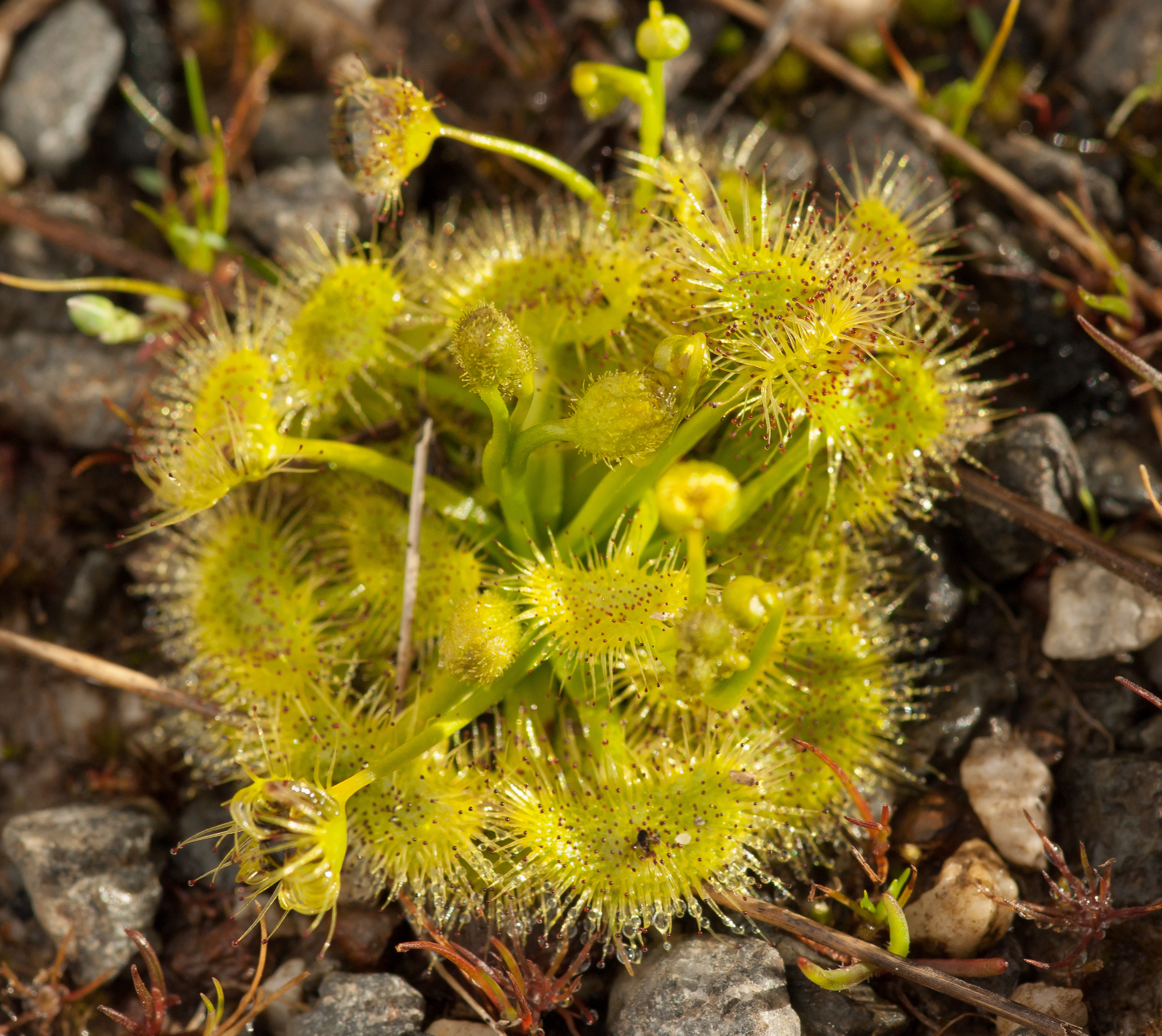
Drosera foliosa (Drosera peltata var. foliosa) growing in George Town, Tasmania, Australia

Basal rosette of Drosera gracilis (Drosera peltata var. gracilis)

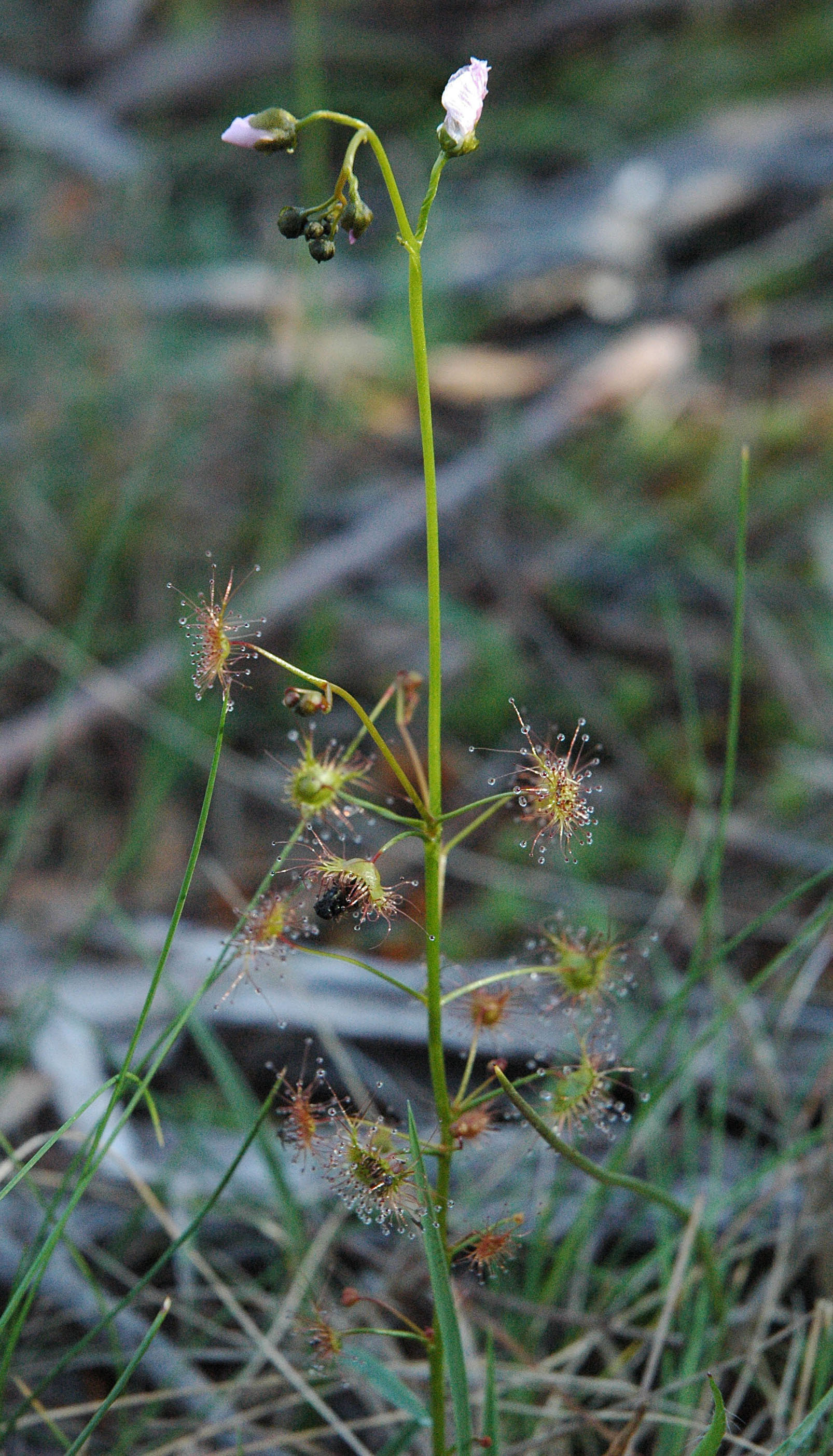
Drosera peltata subsp. auriculata

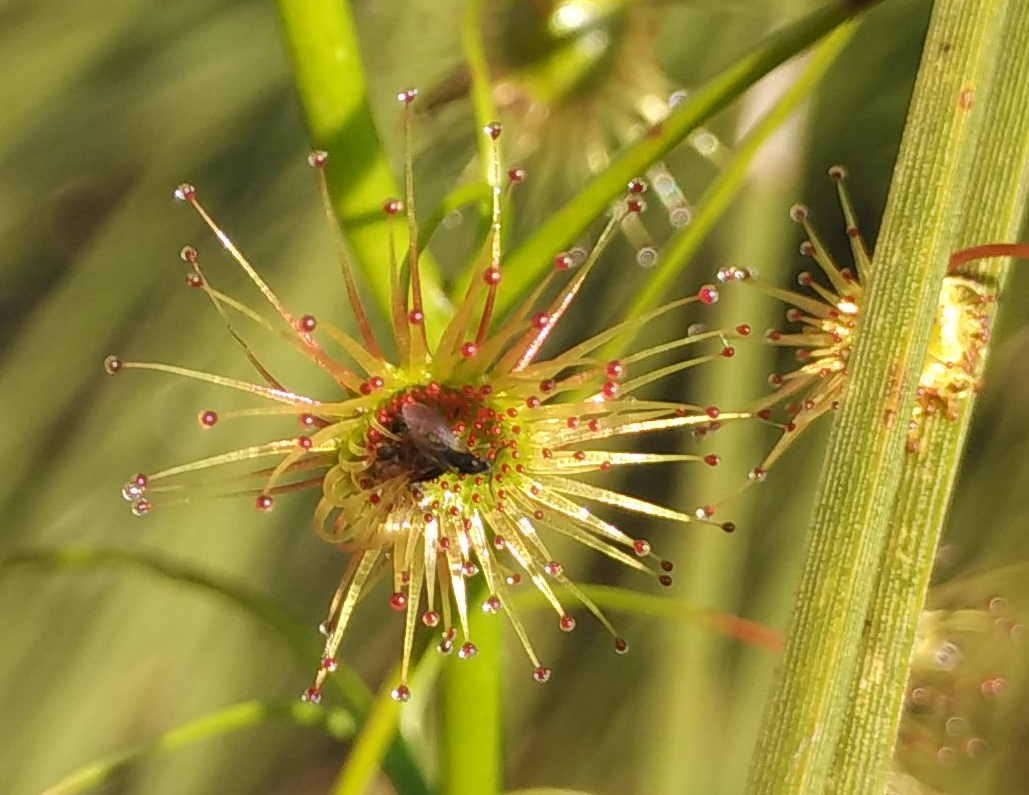
Close-up of Drosera peltata subsp. auriculata with captured insect.

== See also ==
- List of Drosera species
