= Jules Émile Planchon =

French botanist (1823–1888)

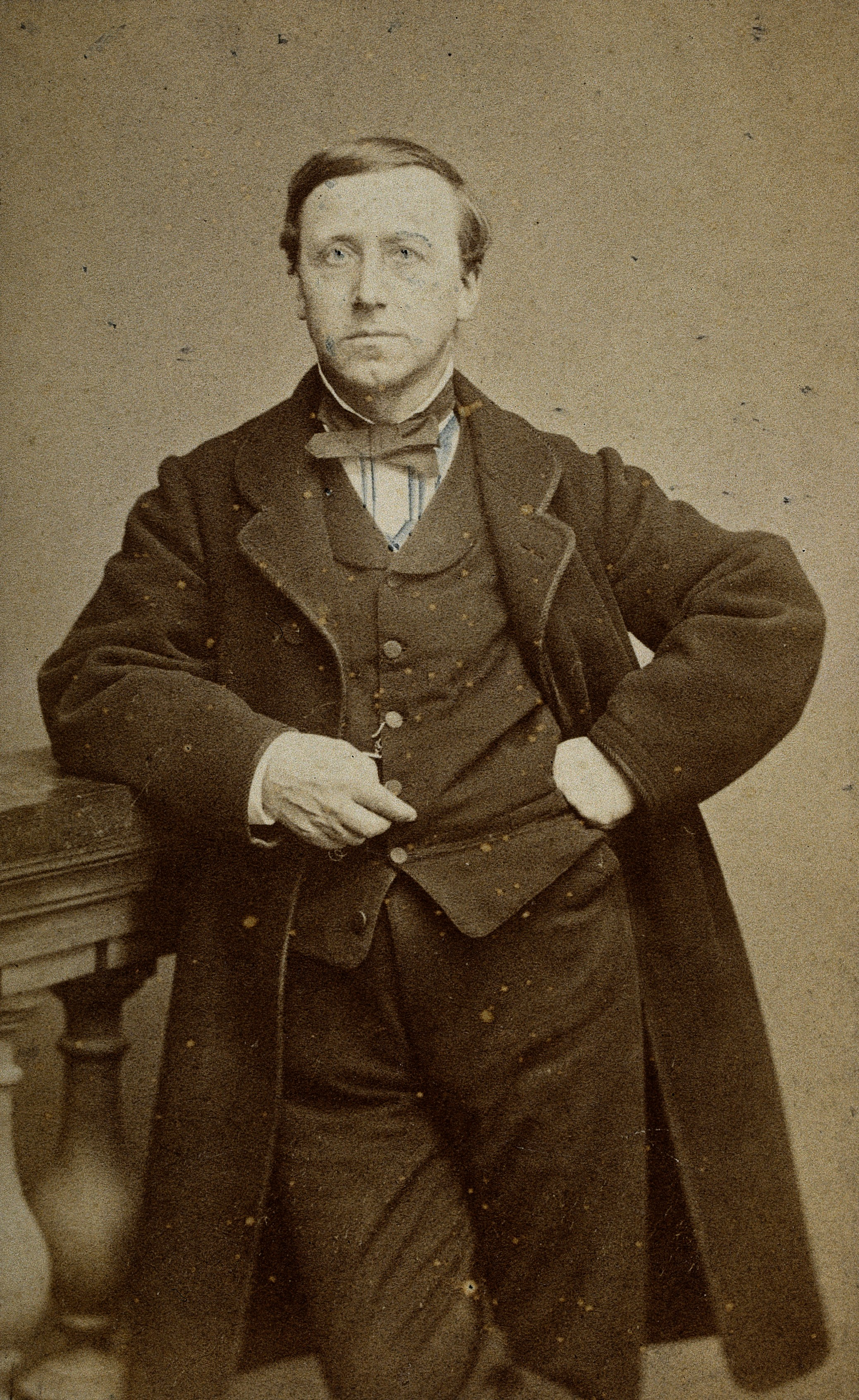
- Jules Émile Planchon
- Born: 21 March 1823; Ganges, Hérault
- Died: 1 April 1888 (aged 65)
- Occupation: botanist
- Known for: saving vines from disease
- Scientific career
- Author abbrev. (botany): Planch.

Jules Émile Planchon (21 March 1823 – 1 April 1888) was a French botanist born in Ganges, Hérault. He was a brother of Gustave Planchon who also studied medicinal plants.

== Biography ==
After receiving his Doctorate of Science at the University of Montpellier in 1844, Planchone worked in London for a while at the Royal Botanical Gardens, and for a few years was a teacher in Nancy, France and Ghent, Belgium. In 1853 he became head of the department of botanical sciences at the University of Montpellier, where he remained for the remainder of his career.

Planchon was highly regarded in scientific circles, and made a number of contributions in his classification of botanical species and varieties. He is credited with publishing over 2000 botanical names, including Actinidia chinensis, better known as the "golden kiwifruit".

Planchon is remembered for his work in saving French grape vineyards from Phylloxera vastatrix, a microscopic, yellow aphid-like pest that was an invasive species from the United States imported on Vitis labrusca vines. He performed this task with assistance from French botanist Pierre-Marie-Alexis Millardet and American entomologist Charles Valentine Riley. The solution involved introduction of American grapevines (Vitis riparia and Vitis rupestris) to France for grafting purposes. American horticulturalist, T.V. Munson, was instrumental in identifying and provisioning the American rootstock that was resistant to Phylloxera and suitable for French growing conditions. Planchone died in 1888 and is buried at the Protestant Cemetery, Montpellier.

== Written works ==
- Histoire botanique et horticole des plantes dites Azalées de l'Inde, 1854
- Des hermodactes au point de vue botanique et pharmaceutique, 1856
- Mémoire sur la famille des Guttiferes, 1862
- Le Phylloxéra (de 1854 à 1873) résumé pratique et scientifique, 1873
- Les mœurs du Phylloxéra de la vigne: résumé biologique, 1877
- Les vignes américaines: leur culture, leur résistance au phylloxéra et leur avenir en Europe, 1875
  - Works in English:
- "On Meliantheae, a new natural order" proposed and defined by J. E. Planchon, 1848
- "The Eucalyptus globulus from a botanic, economic, and medical point of view, embracing its introduction, culture, and uses" 1875
  - Writings about Jules Planchon:
- "The Botanist and the Vintner; How Wine Was Saved for the World", by Christy Campbell
