= Neville Graeme Marchant =

Australian botanist

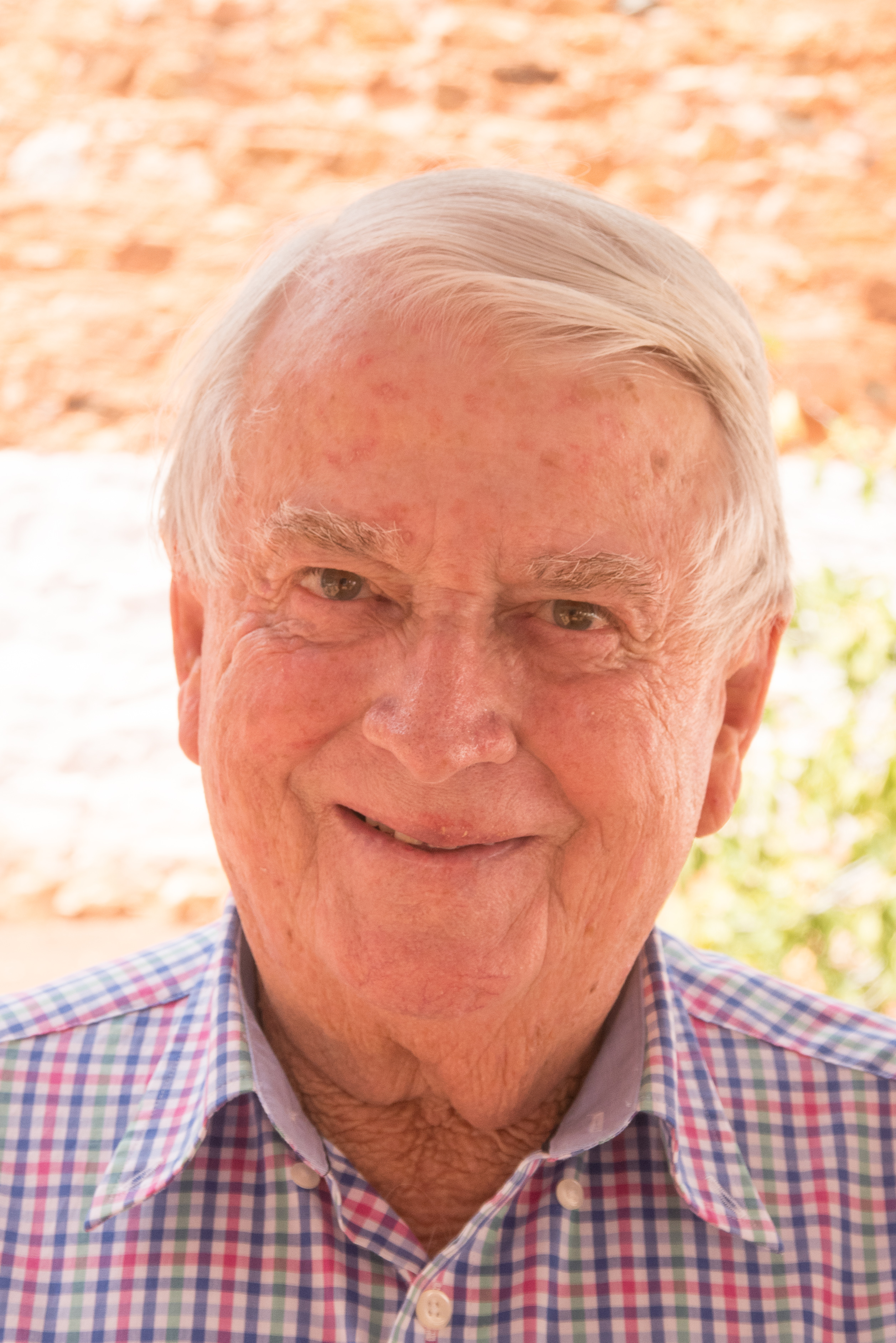
Neville Marchant, February 2018

Neville Graeme Marchant (born 1939) is a retired Western Australian botanist. He was formerly the Director of the Western Australian Herbarium.

Marchant began working for the Western Australian Herbarium at the age of 15, as a laboratory assistant to Government Botanist Charles Gardner. Later he attended the University of Western Australia, graduating in 1962. He taught for a short time, including under Professor Brian Grieve, before taking up a scholarship to study at Cambridge University. After attaining a PhD in plant taxonomy, he won a position on the staff of the Western Australian Herbarium, which he took up in 1970. In 2001 and 2002 he was Australian Botanical Liaison Officer at the Royal Botanic Gardens, Kew.

He was involved in the development of FloraBase, and the establishment of regional herbaria. He was also a driving force behind Botany 2000. He is an author of the 1987 book Flora of the Perth region and the 2002 book Flora of the South West, and has also published on the history of the Herbarium. His research interests include the genus Drosera.

Both the lichen genus Nevilleiella (2017), and its type species, originally named Caloplaca marchantii (2007), were named in his honour.

== See also ==
- Category:Taxa named by Neville Graeme Marchant
