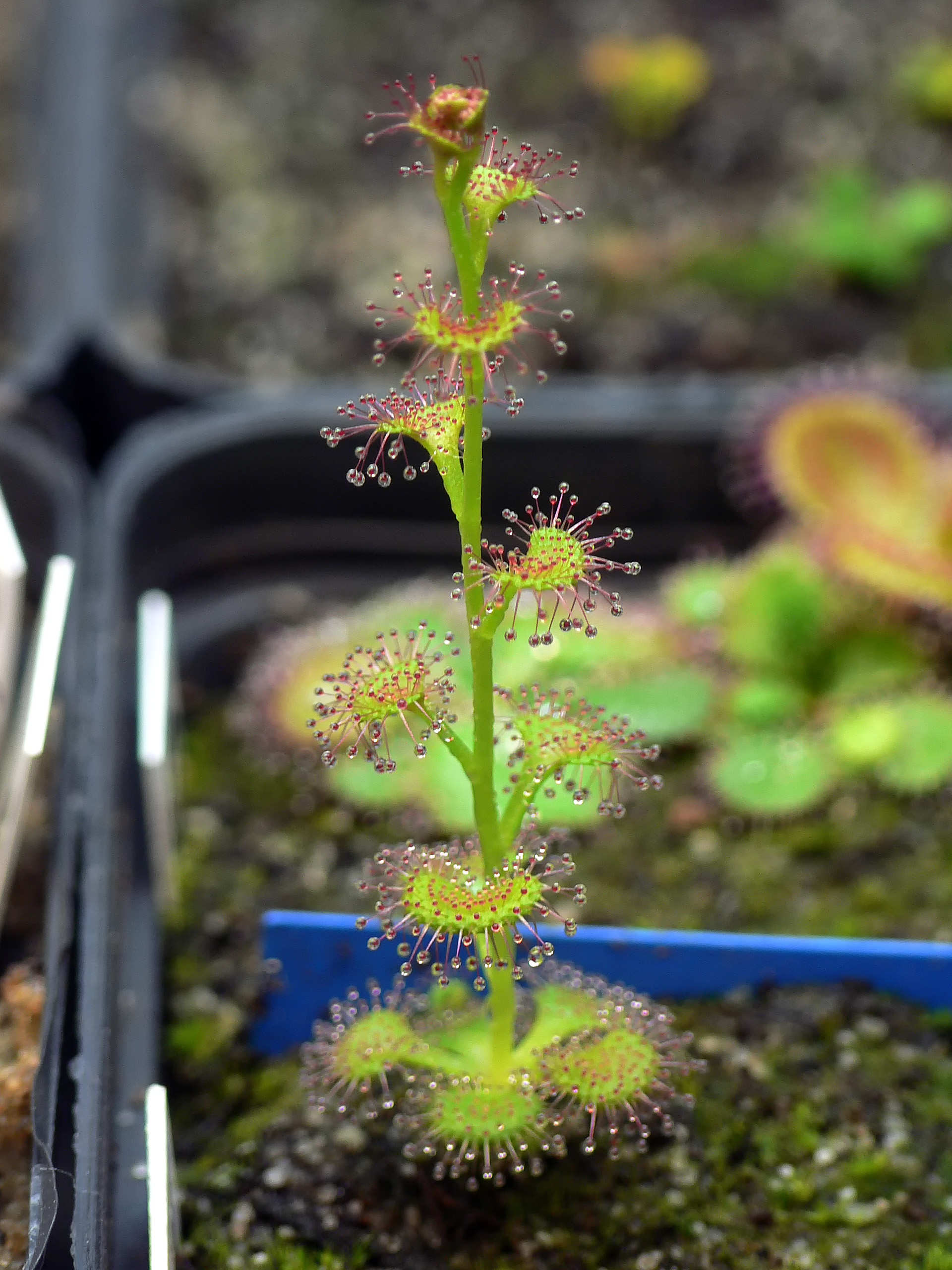
- Drosera platypoda, a member of subgenus Ergaleium section Stolonifera

Scientific classification
- Kingdom: Plantae
- Clade: Tracheophytes
- Clade: Angiosperms
- Clade: Eudicots
- Order: Caryophyllales
- Family: Droseraceae
- Genus: Drosera
- Subgenus: Drosera subg. Ergaleium

Type species
- D. menziesii DC.

Sections
- Ergaleium; Erythrorhiza; Stolonifera

= Drosera subg. Ergaleium =

Subgenus of carnivorous plants

Drosera subg. Ergaleium, collectively known as the tuberous sundews, is a subgenus of three sections of tuberous species in the genus Drosera. The three sections represent natural groups, including the rosetted species (section Erythrorhiza), the fan-leaved species (section Stolonifera), and the erect or scrambling species (section Ergaleium).

The subgenus was first formally described by Augustin Pyramus de Candolle in 1824, but the exact taxonomy has been changed frequently since then. In 1848, Jules Émile Planchon reorganized the species into sections, series, and subseries. George Bentham disagreed with Planchon's classification and so in 1864 he divided the genus into just two sections, with all tuberous species in sect. Ergaleium and those without tubers in sect. Rorella. Ludwig Diels reclassified the genus in his 1906 monograph of the family, recognizing subgenus Ergaleium and two sections within it: Erythrorhiza (Planchon) Diels and Polypeltes Diels. Another reclassification occurred in 1977, when Larry Eugene DeBuhr added section Stolonifera, which was based on Planchon's subseries Stoloniferae. Section Polypeltes is now known by the older autonym sect. Ergaleium.

== See also ==
- List of Drosera species
