= John Moir (settler) =

Australian pastoralist (1851–1939)

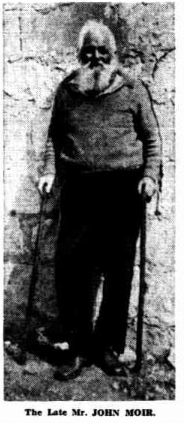
John Moir, c. 1930

John Moir (12 August 1851 – 31 May 1939) was an Australian pastoralist in the areas to the east of Albany, in the Great Southern region of Western Australia.

Born at Cape Riche in 1851, he was the eldest son of the pioneer Andrew Moir, who was from Markinch in Fifeshire, Scotland, and had settled in the region in the 1840s. The Moir family lived in a cottage in the neighbouring allotment to George Cheyne with two of John's brothers working at Cheyne's Cape Riche farm.

The Moir family acquired the Cheyne's property in 1858, including the homestead. The homestead and out-buildings were constructed between 1850 and 1850. A billiards room was built by John Moir with the assistance of Aboriginal people, with a blacksmith shop built at around the same time. Much of the furniture was fashioned from driftwood found on the nearby beaches.

The station was used as supply depot for the sandalwood, whaling and sealing industries that were flourishing in the area through the 1870s to the 1900s.

Moir was married in 1881 and remained at Cape Riche where he had taken a half share of the property on the death of his father.

Moir and his son Neil extended their land-holding along Cheynes Beach in 1920 when they acquired another 1,796 acres (727 ha) of land. Cape Riche Station was still held by the family with Moir's other sons having set up sheep stations further to the east near the Salt River. The Moirs used the sheep for meat production to supply the goldfields around Norseman.

Moir died on 31 May 1938 at Albany Hospital at age 87, and was later buried at Cape Riche.
