= Leucopogon tetragonus =

Scientific classification
- Kingdom: Plantae
- Clade: Tracheophytes
- Clade: Angiosperms
- Clade: Eudicots
- Clade: Asterids
- Order: Ericales
- Family: Ericaceae
- Genus: Leucopogon
- Species: L. tetragonus

Binomial name
- Leucopogon tetragonus Sond.
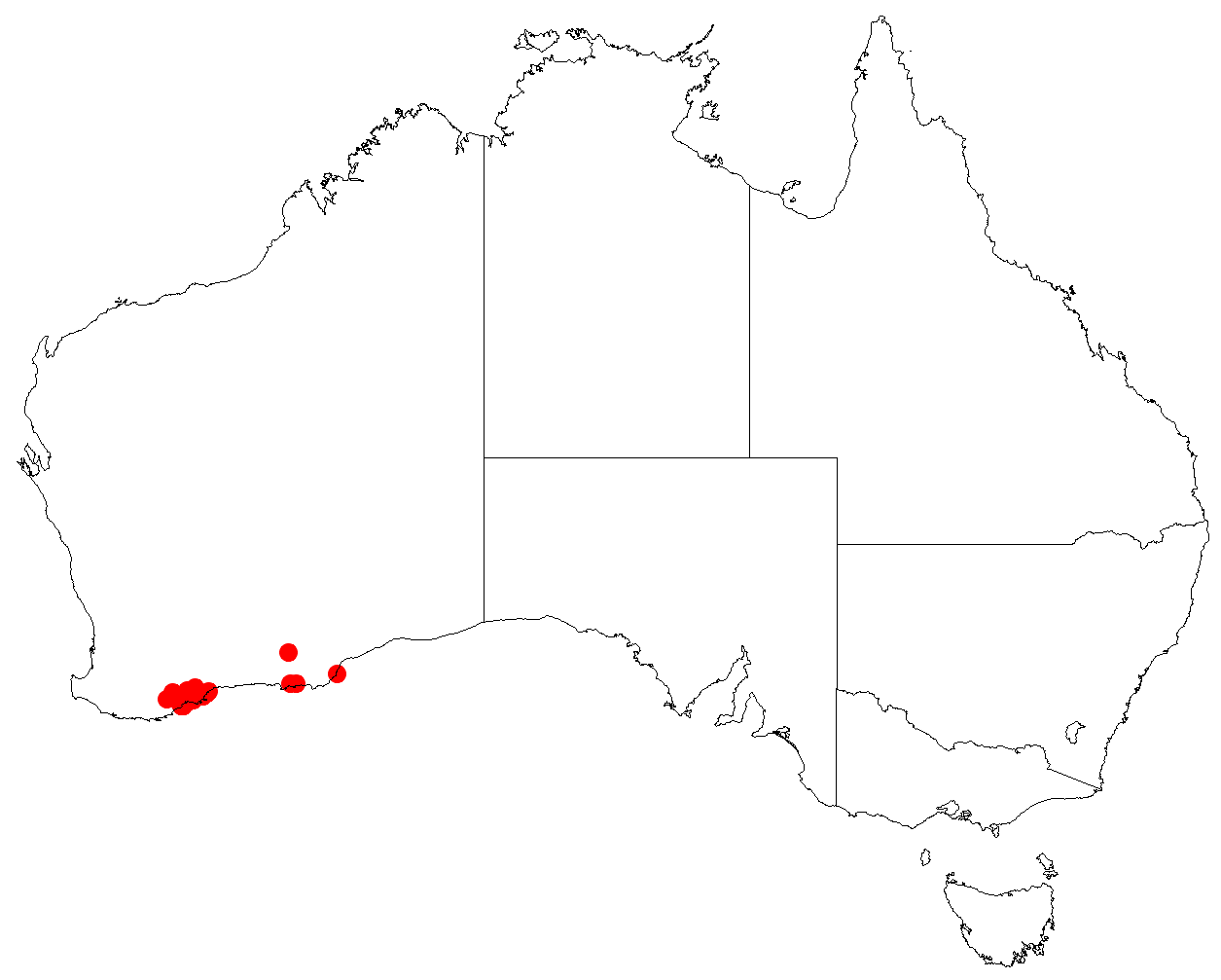
- Occurrence data from AVH

Synonyms
- Styphelia tetragona (Sond.) F.Muell.

Species of shrub

Leucopogon tetragonus is a species of flowering plant in the family Ericaceae, and is endemic to the south of Western Australia. It is a robust shrub with crowded, often decussate, oblong to lance-shaped leaves and short, dense spikes of white, tube-shaped flowers.

== Description ==
Leucopogon tetragonus is a robust shrub that typically grows to a height of 0.3–1 m (1 ft 0 in – 3 ft 3 in) and has softly-hairy branches. Its leaves are crowded, often decussate, oblong to lance-shaped, 2–4 mm (0.079–0.157 in) long and covered with long hairs. The flowers are borne on the ends of branches in short, dense spikes. At the base of the flowers there are small, leaf-like bracts that are longer than the bracteoles, the bracteoles about half as long as the sepals. The sepals are about 2 mm (0.079 in) long, the petals white, about 4 mm (0.16 in) long and joined at the base, forming a tube, the petal lobes longer than the petal tube. Flowering occurs in November and December or January.

== Taxonomy ==
Leucopogon tetragonus was first formally described in 1845 by Otto Wilhelm Sonder in Lehmann's Plantae Preissianae from specimens collected near Cape Riche in 1840. The specific epithet, (tetragonus) refers to the decussate leaves.

== Distribution and habitat ==
This leucopogon grows on rocky ridges and breakaways in shallow soil in the Esperance Plains bioregion of southern Western Australia.
