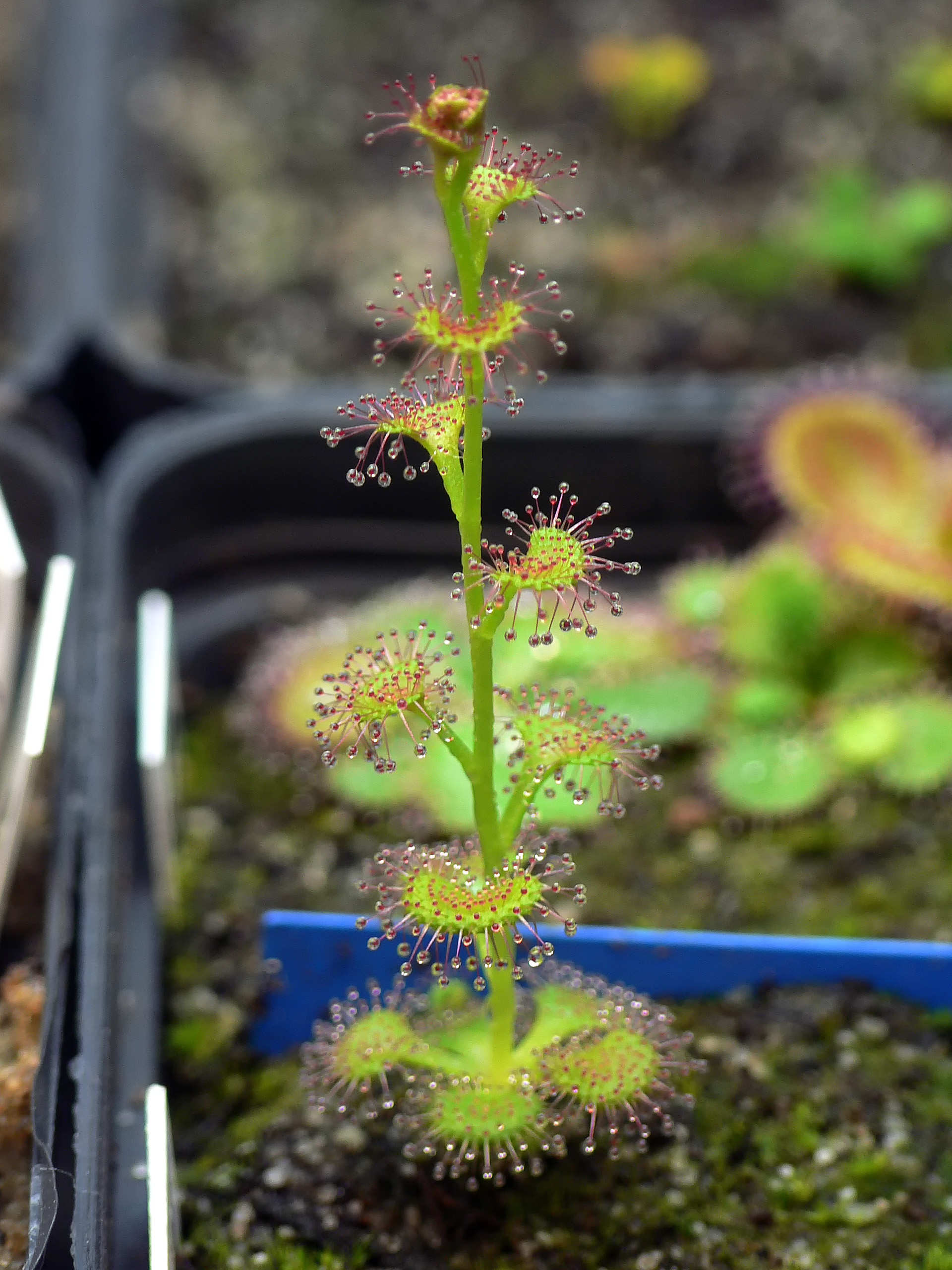
- Drosera platypoda in cultivation

Scientific classification
- Kingdom: Plantae
- Clade: Tracheophytes
- Clade: Angiosperms
- Clade: Eudicots
- Order: Caryophyllales
- Family: Droseraceae
- Genus: Drosera
- Subgenus: Drosera subg. Ergaleium
- Section: Drosera sect. Stolonifera
- Species: D. platypoda

Binomial name
- Drosera platypoda Turcz.

Synonyms
- D. flabellata Benth.

= Drosera platypoda =

Species of carnivorous plant

Drosera platypoda, the fan-leaved sundew, is a tuberous perennial species in the genus Drosera that is endemic to south-west Western Australia. It grows 15 to 20 cm tall with a basal rosette of leaves with alternate cauline leaves along the stem. It is native to a region from Manjimup south-west to an area around the Scott River and east to Cape Riche. It grows in winter-wet sandy soils in heathland. It flowers in October.

It was first formally described by Nicolai Stepanovitch Turczaninow in 1854.

== See also ==
- List of Drosera species
