= Bossiaea tasmanica =

Scientific classification
- Kingdom: Plantae
- Clade: Tracheophytes
- Clade: Angiosperms
- Clade: Eudicots
- Clade: Rosids
- Order: Fabales
- Family: Fabaceae
- Subfamily: Faboideae
- Genus: Bossiaea
- Species: B. tasmanica

Binomial name
- Bossiaea tasmanica I.Thomps.
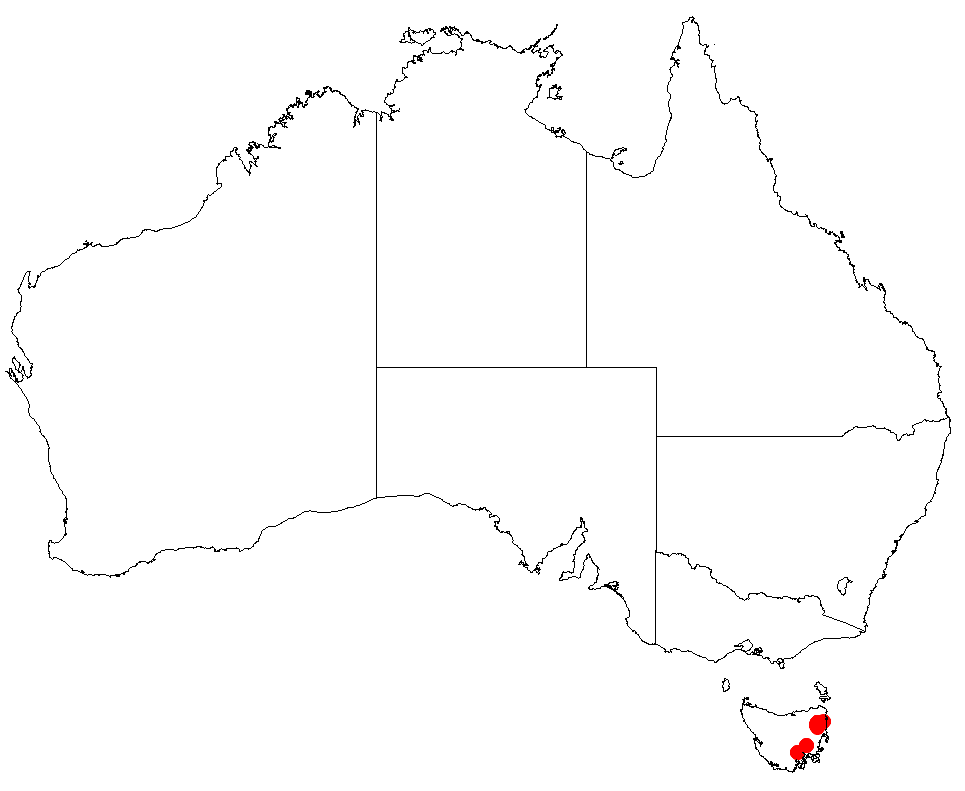
- Occurrence data from the AVH

Synonyms
- Bossiaea cinerea var. rigida Rodway

Species of legume

Bossiaea tasmanica is a species of flowering plant in the family Fabaceae and is endemic to Tasmania. It is a prostrate or low-lying shrub with spiny branches, elliptic to egg-shaped leaves with the narrower end towards the base, and yellow and red to pink flowers.

== Description ==
Bossiaea tasmanica is a prostrate or low-lying shrub that typically grows to a height of about 30 cm (12 in), its branches often ending in a spine. The leaves are elliptic to egg-shaped with the narrower end towards the base, 3–7 mm (0.12–0.28 in) long and 2–5 mm (0.079–0.197 in) wide on a petiole about 0.5 mm (0.020 in) long with stipules 0.8–1.5 mm (0.031–0.059 in) long at the base.

The flowers are borne in leaf axils near the ends of branches, each flower up to 10 mm (0.39 in) long on a pedicel 2–3 mm (0.079–0.118 in) long. There are bracts are 1.0–1.3 mm (0.039–0.051 in) long at the base of the pedicel, and bracteoles 1.0–1.5 mm (0.039–0.059 in) long but that fall off as the flower opens. The five sepals are 2.5–4 mm (0.098–0.157 in) long and joined at the base forming a tube, the upper lobes are 1.5–2.0 mm (0.059–0.079 in) long and wide, and the lower lobes are narrower. The standard petal is yellow with a red base and up to about 10 mm (0.39 in) long, the wings purplish-brown and 2.0–2.5 mm (0.079–0.098 in) wide, and the keel yellowish-green, sometimes with a pinkish tinge, and about 3 mm (0.12 in) wide. Flowering occurs in November and December and the fruit is a more or less oblong pod about 15 mm (0.59 in) long.

This bossiaea is closely related to B. obcordata, but differs from it in being more prostrate, and in having branchlets that are more wax-encrusted with blunter spines, narrower leaves and hairy sepals and fruit.

== Taxonomy ==
This species was first formally described in 1903 by Leonard Rodway who gave it the name Bossiaea cinerea var. rigida in his book, The Tasmanian Flora from specimens collected at "The Rocks, near New Norfolk". In 2012, Ian Thompson revised the genus, Bossiaea, and raised this taxon to species status. The name Bossiaea rigida was not available as it had already been used by Nikolai Turczaninow for a species now known as Bossiaea preissii. Thompson used the name Bossiaea tasmanica as this is the only endemic species of Bossiaea in Tasmania.

== Distribution and habitat ==
Bossiaea tasmanica grows in forest and woodland in north-eastern Tasmania near Mathinna and in south-eastern Tasmania near Oatlands.

== Conservation status ==
This bossiaea is listed as "rare" under the Threatened Species Protection Act 1995.
