= List of homesteads in Western Australia: C =

This list includes all homesteads in Western Australia with a gazetted name. It is complete with respect to the 1996 Gazetteer of Australia. Dubious names and positions have been checked against the online 2004 data, and corrected if necessary. However, if any homesteads have been gazetted or deleted since 1996, this list does not reflect these changes. Strictly speaking, Australian place names are gazetted in capital letters only; the names in this list have been converted to mixed case in accordance with normal capitalisation conventions.

Name	Location	Remarks
Cadeby Downs	34°14′S 115°8′E	
Cainwill	33°40′S 115°55′E	
Cairs Brook	33°33′S 115°56′E	
Caitup Downs	33°44′S 121°44′E	
Calcamine	31°37′S 116°47′E	
Calila	28°48′S 114°53′E	
Calita	29°57′S 116°28′E	
Callagiddy	25°3′S 114°2′E	
Callawa	20°38′S 120°30′E	
Callenup	33°45′S 121°40′E	
Callytharra Springs	25°49′S 115°23′E	
Calmony	31°33′S 116°44′E	
Calton Hill	33°28′S 121°1′E	
Calwynyardah	18°0′S 124°47′E	
Cam Fields	33°40′S 115°51′E	
Camalilup	33°41′S 118°21′E	
Camalilup	33°44′S 118°21′E	
Camballup	34°32′S 117°11′E	
Cambalup Farm	33°57′S 115°15′E	
Cambawarra	34°15′S 118°9′E	
Cambridge Downs	33°44′S 120°26′E	
Cambusgray	33°40′S 121°27′E	
Camden	33°28′S 115°44′E	
Camlebren	34°19′S 118°47′E	
Campbell Park	32°49′S 117°5′E	
Canberra	33°50′S 117°8′E	
Canberra	34°8′S 117°27′E	
Canberra West	34°35′S 118°26′E	
Cancanning	33°10′S 117°33′E	
Candowie	34°11′S 115°6′E	
Cane Break	34°16′S 115°25′E	
Cane River	22°5′S 115°37′E	
Canowie Downs	34°38′S 118°12′E	
Canowindra	33°46′S 121°48′E	
Capalcarra	30°38′S 116°2′E	
Cape Farm	33°33′S 115°2′E	
Cape Riche	34°37′S 118°45′E	
Capecup	33°58′S 118°32′E	
Capeldene	33°44′S 115°49′E	
Capemont	33°43′S 117°31′E	
Capitela	30°51′S 115°52′E	
Capolinga	32°19′S 118°19′E	
Cappery	32°29′S 117°54′E	
Caraban	31°20′S 115°33′E	
Carabin	32°44′S 116°53′E	
Carabin	33°45′S 115°52′E	
Caradene	28°31′S 115°22′E	
Carallen	33°44′S 117°56′E	
Caramarak	30°57′S 116°21′E	
Carawatha	33°57′S 117°40′E	
Carawatha	33°4′S 117°28′E	
Carberdine	33°16′S 117°6′E	
Carbethon	30°34′S 115°53′E	
Carbine	30°29′S 120°55′E	
Carbla	26°12′S 114°17′E	
Cardabia	23°6′S 113°48′E	
Cardibane	31°18′S 116°7′E	
Cardininup	34°2′S 118°43′E	
Cardo	30°22′S 116°14′E	
Cardo Outstation	22°15′S 116°8′E	
Carenda Stud	33°31′S 115°40′E	
Carey Downs	25°37′S 115°28′E	
Caringa	33°19′S 118°59′E	
Caringal	33°35′S 118°40′E	
Carinya	33°1′S 115°50′E	
Carinya	34°55′S 116°48′E	
Carinya	34°16′S 118°23′E	
Carinya	33°57′S 116°1′E	
Carinya	33°45′S 119°22′E	
Carinya	33°19′S 117°14′E	
Carinya	33°29′S 118°31′E	
Carinya Downs	32°52′S 117°19′E	
Carinya Park	34°24′S 117°37′E	
Carlaminda	28°17′S 116°43′E	
Carlaminda	33°25′S 115°50′E	
Carlin	31°44′S 116°27′E	
Carlindie	20°38′S 119°14′E	
Carlton Hill	15°29′S 128°32′E	
Carlton Lea	27°56′S 114°41′E	
Carmoning	33°21′S 117°10′E	
Carnegie	25°48′S 122°58′E	
Caro	30°45′S 115°30′E	
Carolyn Downs	33°37′S 122°15′E	
Caronia	34°49′S 118°0′E	
Carrabunjup	34°29′S 117°19′E	
Carrajon	32°57′S 118°22′E	
Carralling Park	33°6′S 116°52′E	
Carramar	33°52′S 118°27′E	
Carramar	33°31′S 117°35′E	
Carramar Park	34°6′S 117°17′E	
Carramarra	30°37′S 115°55′E	
Carranya	19°14′S 127°46′E	
Carrarang	26°28′S 113°30′E	
Carrievale	31°19′S 116°8′E	
Carrigaline	33°23′S 117°0′E	
Carrimurren	33°12′S 117°33′E	
Carrington	34°2′S 117°20′E	
Carson River	14°29′S 126°46′E	
Carterville	31°31′S 116°57′E	
Cascade Downs	33°33′S 121°17′E	
Cashmere Downs	28°58′S 119°34′E	
Castle Rock	33°50′S 121°55′E	
Castle Rock	32°0′S 116°46′E	
Castledene	33°43′S 115°50′E	
Casuarina	33°34′S 116°35′E	
Casuarina	28°55′S 115°23′E	
Casuarina Vale	31°10′S 116°51′E	
Cataby	33°16′S 121°6′E	
Cataby	30°44′S 115°34′E	
Catalina	29°56′S 116°17′E	
Cattle Chosen	33°40′S 115°21′E	
Caufield	33°20′S 117°31′E	
Cavadalla	34°24′S 119°14′E	
Caves House	33°38′S 115°2′E	
Cawarra	34°19′S 119°0′E	
Cedar Park	32°42′S 118°16′E	
Centre Forest	31°29′S 116°50′E	
Chaddesley	28°39′S 115°7′E	
Challa	28°17′S 118°19′E	
Chamingup	33°55′S 117°6′E	
Chan-chanup	33°54′S 117°22′E	
Chanchanning	33°19′S 117°4′E	
Chandala Brook	31°26′S 115°55′E	
Chandling	31°11′S 116°35′E	
Chapel Estate	33°50′S 117°13′E	
Charandor	34°16′S 115°6′E	
Chararoo Outcamp	23°32′S 115°43′E	
Charla Downs	32°52′S 115°45′E	
Charlies Place	33°41′S 115°17′E	
Chasrose	33°1′S 119°16′E	
Chatcup	31°27′S 116°29′E	
Chateau Barker	34°34′S 117°38′E	
Chatham	31°18′S 116°50′E	
Chatillon	31°20′S 115°46′E	
Chatswood	34°44′S 117°21′E	
Chedaring	31°44′S 116°22′E	
Cheela Outcamp	22°58′S 116°51′E	
Cheerokee Farm	29°54′S 116°25′E	
Cheeryna	33°9′S 116°58′E	
Chelita	33°51′S 115°9′E	
Chelsea	33°31′S 117°34′E	
Chelsea	30°38′S 115°46′E	
Chenar	33°17′S 115°50′E	
Cherene	34°13′S 119°2′E	
Cherenup	34°6′S 118°44′E	
Cheridon	34°33′S 116°57′E	
Cheridup	34°5′S 118°17′E	
Cheriton	33°29′S 117°25′E	
Cheriton	31°18′S 115°54′E	
Cherrabun	18°55′S 125°31′E	
Cherratta	21°1′S 116°48′E	
Cherry Tree	33°42′S 117°14′E	
Cheryton	33°58′S 117°9′E	
Chesterfield	33°43′S 117°40′E	
Cheviot Hills	32°22′S 117°57′E	
Cheviot Hills	33°42′S 117°22′E	
Cheviot Hills	33°36′S 115°55′E	
Cheyenne	34°54′S 117°5′E	
Cheyne Downs	34°41′S 118°13′E	
Chilbolton	33°39′S 117°34′E	
Chillakerup	34°21′S 117°14′E	
Chillinup	34°21′S 118°44′E	
Chingford	32°29′S 117°0′E	
Chippendale	33°18′S 116°9′E	
Chirelillup	33°58′S 118°4′E	
Chiswick	33°35′S 116°17′E	
Chitibin	31°29′S 116°40′E	
Chitna	31°20′S 115°40′E	
Chitterbin	34°2′S 115°2′E	
Chittering Hills	31°31′S 116°7′E	
Chittermanning	33°17′S 117°12′E	
Chocolate Hills	32°6′S 116°51′E	
Chocolate Hills	33°50′S 115°47′E	
Chorkerup Farm	34°50′S 117°41′E	
Christmas Brook	33°58′S 115°47′E	
Christmas Creek	18°53′S 125°55′E	
Christmas Farm	33°58′S 117°57′E	
Chudderee	33°27′S 115°46′E	
Chudleigh	34°3′S 117°56′E	
Church Hills	31°28′S 116°27′E	
Cintramia	33°19′S 117°19′E	
Circle Valley Farm	33°14′S 121°51′E	
Clairfontaine	33°38′S 115°28′E	
Clanmea	33°51′S 116°56′E	
Clare Downs	33°36′S 120°59′E	
Claredale	32°58′S 117°18′E	
Clarenden	29°15′S 115°50′E	
Clarevale	33°47′S 117°54′E	
Clarina	31°31′S 116°8′E	
Clausen	29°59′S 115°25′E	
Claver Valley	33°19′S 116°4′E	
Claylands	33°4′S 115°49′E	
Clayton	33°46′S 117°8′E	
Clayton	31°10′S 116°39′E	
Clear Hill	33°45′S 117°2′E	
Clear Hills	33°58′S 117°54′E	
Clear Valley	33°57′S 117°57′E	
Clearlands	32°19′S 116°47′E	
Clearview	32°27′S 117°4′E	
Cleveland	33°52′S 117°14′E	
Cli-an Ville	34°39′S 117°53′E	
Clifden	33°51′S 117°38′E	
Clifton	33°36′S 117°48′E	
Clifton	30°34′S 116°55′E	
Clifton Grange	33°57′S 117°59′E	
Clifton Hill	33°15′S 117°40′E	
Clifton Hill	34°28′S 117°32′E	
Cliftondale	34°7′S 117°15′E	
Cliftonvale	33°51′S 117°39′E	
Clivevale	30°41′S 116°0′E	
Cloughton	34°23′S 118°51′E	
Clovelly	32°5′S 116°56′E	
Clovelly	33°19′S 117°12′E	
Clover Dale	32°15′S 116°41′E	
Clover Downs	32°0′S 116°40′E	
Clover Downs	34°57′S 117°50′E	
Clover Downs	28°53′S 121°18′E	
Clover Hill	33°41′S 115°3′E	
Clover Lea	34°3′S 115°8′E	
Cloverbank	34°30′S 117°33′E	
Cloverdale	33°52′S 116°32′E	
Cloverdale	33°32′S 116°25′E	
Cloverdale	32°27′S 117°21′E	
Cloverdale	32°57′S 117°12′E	
Cloverdene	33°32′S 115°38′E	
Cloverdene	34°13′S 115°7′E	
Cloverlea	33°26′S 116°56′E	
Cloverlea	31°45′S 116°34′E	
Cloverlock	33°41′S 116°28′E	
Cloverlock	33°50′S 115°19′E	
Clovermoor	33°49′S 115°13′E	
Clunedale Park	31°21′S 116°5′E	
Clydebank	33°23′S 116°19′E	
Clydesdale	32°16′S 116°35′E	
Cobbler Pool	31°34′S 116°19′E	
Coben	33°36′S 117°1′E	
Cobham	31°48′S 116°42′E	
Cobra	24°12′S 116°28′E	
Coburn	26°42′S 114°19′E	
Cocanarup	33°38′S 119°53′E	
Cogla Downs	27°26′S 118°55′E	
Cogmel-mia	33°41′S 121°22′E	
Cojuma	33°57′S 118°45′E	
Colby	33°52′S 117°58′E	
Colerane	32°29′S 116°46′E	
Colgonine	31°47′S 116°31′E	
Colhaven	33°38′S 117°6′E	
Colina	33°37′S 122°57′E	
Colingrove	31°55′S 116°53′E	
Colladdie	33°40′S 119°18′E	
Collanilling	33°10′S 117°35′E	
Colliedale	33°22′S 116°18′E	
Collinsville	32°27′S 118°18′E	
Coln Valley	33°4′S 118°35′E	
Colombera	33°43′S 115°11′E	
Colonial	34°9′S 117°20′E	
Colorado	32°29′S 117°34′E	
Colovale	32°27′S 117°39′E	
Colwyn	32°54′S 117°25′E	
Comadyne	32°47′S 117°23′E	
Cometville	33°39′S 115°10′E	
Comos	31°28′S 116°47′E	
Conamoore Farms	29°58′S 115°25′E	
Condamine	33°37′S 117°33′E	
Condeena	33°50′S 117°33′E	
Condign	33°14′S 119°6′E	
Condingup	33°45′S 122°32′E	
Condolong	34°5′S 116°54′E	
Congeling Park	32°51′S 116°54′E	
Coniston	33°56′S 117°1′E	
Conmurra	32°56′S 117°26′E	
Connemara Downs	34°46′S 117°54′E	
Conting	32°49′S 117°0′E	
Coodardy	27°15′S 117°39′E	
Cooella	33°50′S 115°58′E	
Coogelly Park	31°39′S 116°37′E	
Cooinda	34°10′S 117°51′E	
Cookalabi	30°28′S 116°6′E	
Cookerabinge Outcamp	23°26′S 114°7′E	
Cooladerra	34°18′S 117°10′E	
Coolalya	28°44′S 114°50′E	
Coolamen	30°55′S 118°8′E	
Coolangatta	28°54′S 115°27′E	
Coolangatta	33°19′S 116°13′E	
Coolangatta	34°49′S 118°1′E	
Coolangatta	34°3′S 117°5′E	
Coolawalla	32°6′S 117°20′E	
Coolawanyah	21°48′S 117°48′E	
Coolawarra	29°8′S 115°6′E	
Coolcalalaya	27°32′S 115°3′E	
Coolinbah Outcamp	23°45′S 115°40′E	
Cooljarloo	30°39′S 115°23′E	
Cooloomia	26°56′S 114°18′E	
Coomal	33°35′S 115°36′E	
Coompatine	33°34′S 117°32′E	
Coomunga West	34°44′S 118°23′E	
Coonabidgee	31°23′S 115°50′E	
Coonack Downs	34°15′S 115°21′E	
Coonana	31°4′S 123°16′E	
Coonara	33°1′S 119°17′E	
Coonawarra	34°12′S 118°56′E	
Coonawarra	34°57′S 117°20′E	
Coondawa Outcamp	26°51′S 116°28′E	
Coondee	32°29′S 116°48′E	
Coonderoo	30°32′S 116°2′E	
Coondewa	29°5′S 115°17′E	
Coongan	20°41′S 119°40′E	
Coonida	33°27′S 115°51′E	
Cooper Ranch	33°32′S 115°38′E	
Coor-de-wandy	25°36′S 115°58′E	
Cooralong	33°56′S 117°5′E	
Cooralya	24°27′S 114°5′E	
Coorang	31°5′S 115°51′E	
Coorong	29°11′S 115°16′E	
Cootamundara	33°36′S 116°18′E	
Cooya Pooya	21°2′S 117°8′E	
Copley Valley	18°3′S 125°44′E	
Corackerup	34°3′S 118°40′E	
Coradine	33°0′S 116°49′E	
Coral Park East	32°23′S 116°48′E	
Coramup Park	33°44′S 121°58′E	
Coranderrk	33°27′S 115°35′E	
Corangamite	34°44′S 117°57′E	
Coranup Park	34°30′S 117°6′E	
Cordering Farm	33°29′S 116°39′E	
Cordinup	34°42′S 118°33′E	
Coringa	31°38′S 116°5′E	
Corinya	32°5′S 117°29′E	
Corio	33°36′S 120°27′E	
Corless Farms	33°38′S 121°42′E	
Corn Hill	31°53′S 116°51′E	
Corn Hill	33°42′S 117°44′E	
Corolin	31°46′S 116°37′E	
Coromandel	34°20′S 119°1′E	
Corralyn	33°17′S 117°20′E	
Corralyn West	33°21′S 117°7′E	
Corrang	34°13′S 118°54′E	
Correring	32°3′S 117°1′E	
Corridine	33°54′S 117°33′E	
Corrielynne	33°54′S 117°30′E	
Corrilup Stud	33°49′S 116°30′E	
Corrow	30°0′S 115°45′E	
Corunna Downs	21°28′S 119°50′E	
Corunna Downs Old	21°26′S 119°47′E	
Costabella	33°47′S 117°25′E	
Cotswold	32°48′S 115°53′E	
Country Downs	17°16′S 122°34′E	
Coventry	33°43′S 115°21′E	
Cowalla	31°3′S 115°34′E	
Cowarna Downs	31°1′S 122°21′E	
Cowering	32°32′S 117°8′E	
Coyrecup	33°40′S 117°50′E	
Craddock Downs	34°34′S 117°33′E	
Craigievale	33°25′S 118°32′E	
Craiglee	34°22′S 117°35′E	
Craiglee	32°2′S 118°6′E	
Craigmoor	33°38′S 116°47′E	
Craigmore	33°34′S 117°38′E	
Craneford Station	33°13′S 119°57′E	
Cranham	33°56′S 117°19′E	
Cranmore Downs	33°41′S 121°51′E	
Cranmore Park	30°36′S 116°18′E	
Crathie	33°57′S 117°20′E	
Crathorne	33°46′S 117°6′E	
Creaton	32°36′S 115°52′E	
Credo	30°28′S 120°50′E	
Creekside	33°43′S 117°34′E	
Creighton	31°24′S 115°56′E	
Crendon	33°39′S 115°49′E	
Cressaire Park	31°0′S 116°22′E	
Creswick	33°35′S 120°4′E	
Crew Pine	33°48′S 117°49′E	
Cross Roads	32°17′S 118°24′E	
Crossburn	33°53′S 117°16′E	
Croydon	31°18′S 116°48′E	
Croydon Outstation	21°7′S 117°48′E	
Crystal Brook	33°38′S 115°57′E	
Crystal Brook	33°42′S 117°16′E	
Crystal Brook	34°46′S 117°34′E	
Crystal Estate	33°32′S 117°16′E	
Crystal Springs	34°8′S 115°7′E	
Crystal Valley	33°18′S 116°1′E	
Cudawa	29°30′S 115°51′E	
Cudduarup	34°32′S 117°18′E	
Cudimera	30°9′S 116°11′E	
Culbin	33°9′S 116°50′E	
Culford	32°34′S 116°26′E	
Culham House	31°25′S 116°27′E	
Culculli	27°5′44″S 118°14′10″E	
Cumavon	33°59′S 117°55′E	
Cundalippy	29°49′S 115°24′E	
Cundlebar	23°52′S 120°10′E	
Cunjardine	31°28′S 116°47′E	
Cunyu	26°1′S 120°7′E	
Curanup	33°59′S 116°34′E	
Curbur	26°28′S 115°56′E	
Currumulka	33°9′S 121°35′E	
Cuthering	31°22′S 116°52′E	
Cyandra	33°20′S 119°56′E	
Cypress Hill	30°30′S 115°58′E	

== See also ==
- List of pastoral leases in Western Australia
