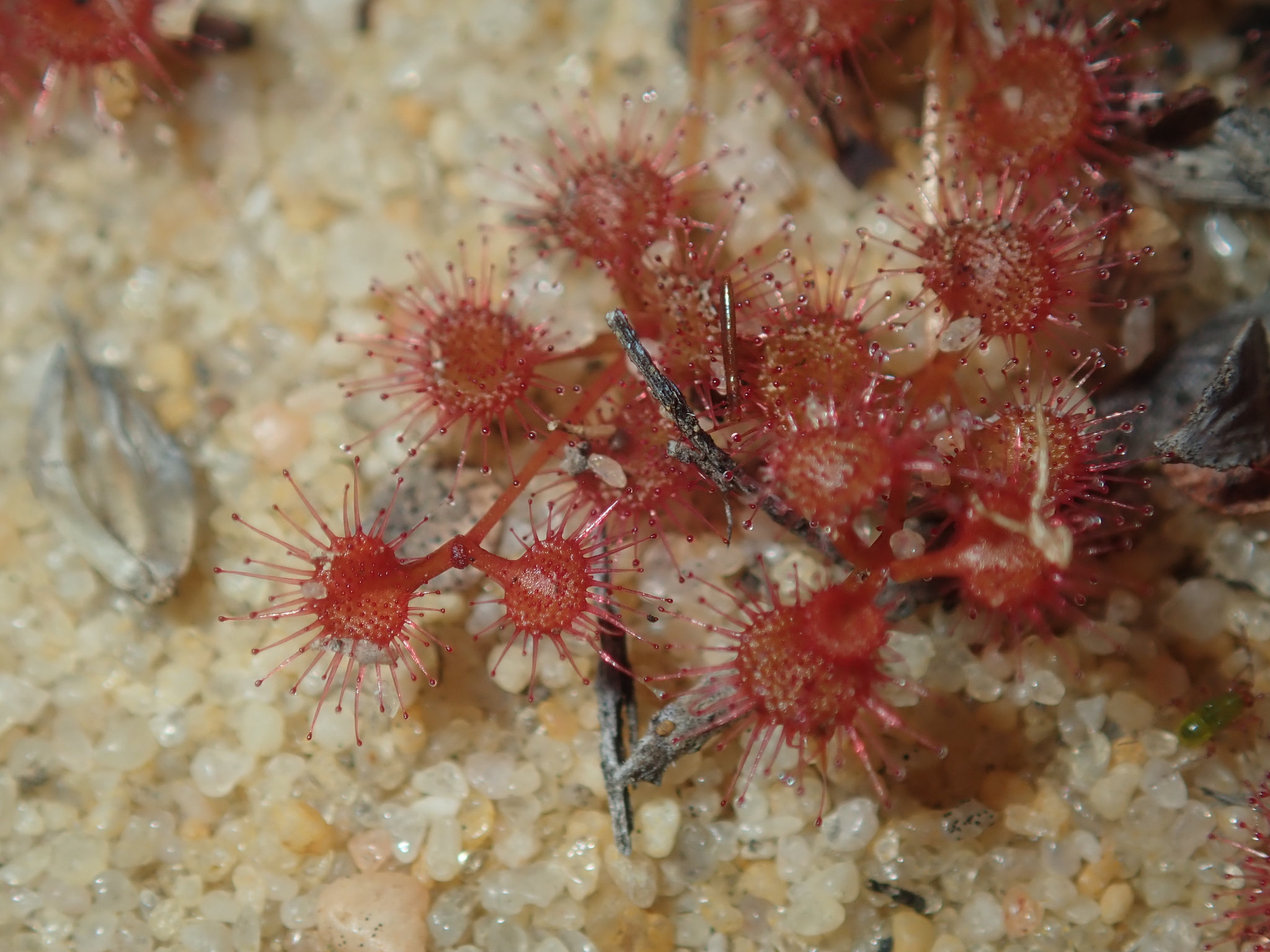

Scientific classification
- Kingdom: Plantae
- Clade: Tracheophytes
- Clade: Angiosperms
- Clade: Eudicots
- Order: Caryophyllales
- Family: Droseraceae
- Genus: Drosera
- Subgenus: Drosera subg. Ergaleium
- Section: Drosera sect. Stolonifera
- Species: D. prostrata

Binomial name
- Drosera prostrata (N.G.Marchant & Lowrie) Lowrie

Synonyms
- D. stolonifera subsp. prostrata N.G.Marchant & Lowrie

= Drosera prostrata =

Species of carnivorous plant

Drosera prostrata is a tuberous perennial species in the family Droseraceae that is endemic to Western Australia. It produces 4 to 5 prostrate lateral stems that are 3.5 to 15 cm long. The prostrate growth habit is what sets it apart from all other members of the section Stolonifera. It is native to a region along the Western Australian coast from the Tamala area near Shark Bay south to Binnu. It grows in well-drained sandy soils and flowers from May to June.

It was first formally described by N. G. Marchant and Allen Lowrie as a subspecies of D. stolonifera in 1992. Lowrie elevated the subspecies to species rank in 2005.

== See also ==
- List of Drosera species
