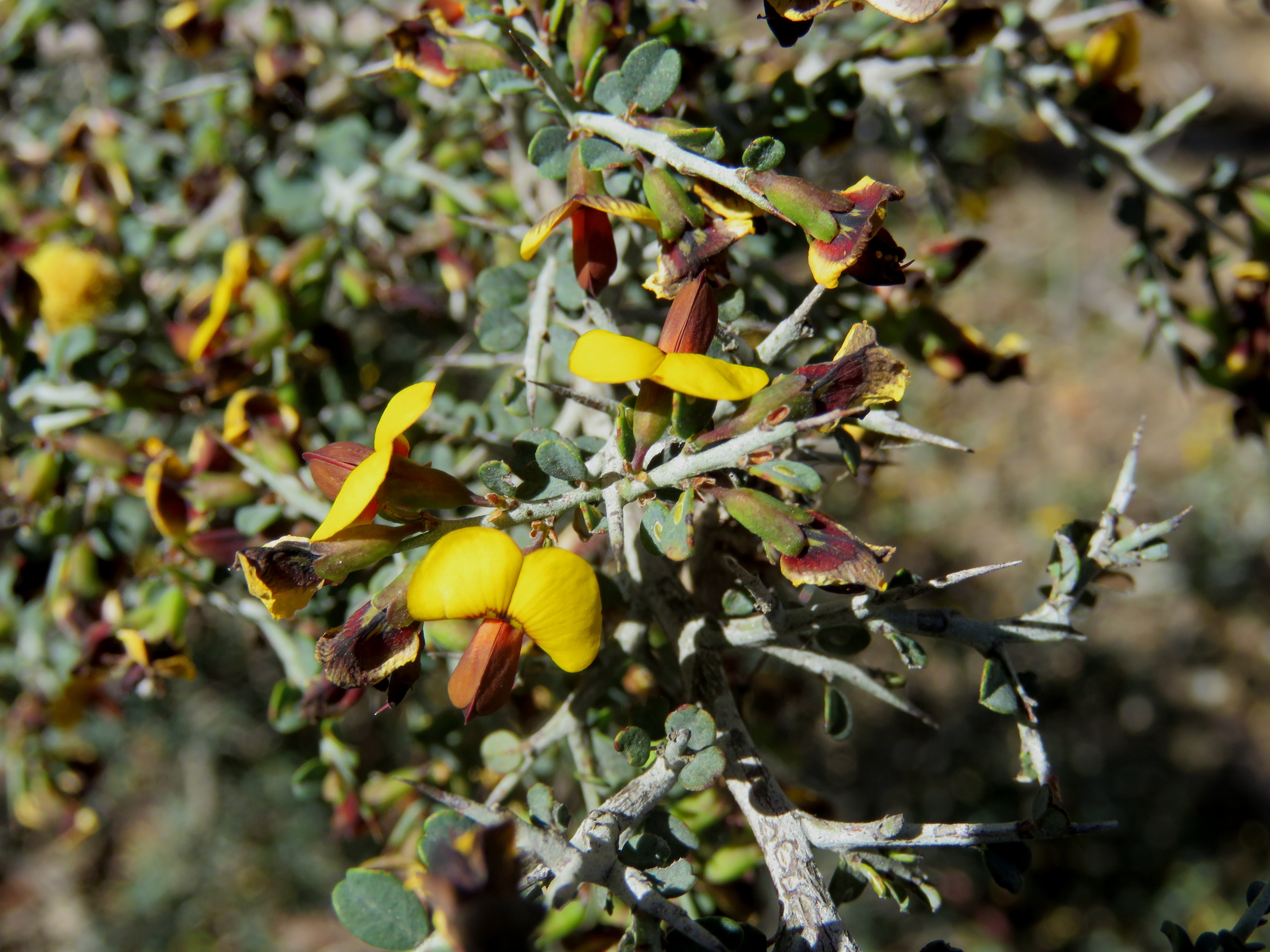
- Brisbane Ranges National Park

Scientific classification
- Kingdom: Plantae
- Clade: Tracheophytes
- Clade: Angiosperms
- Clade: Eudicots
- Clade: Rosids
- Order: Fabales
- Family: Fabaceae
- Subfamily: Faboideae
- Genus: Bossiaea
- Species: B. obcordata

Binomial name
- Bossiaea obcordata (Vent.) Druce
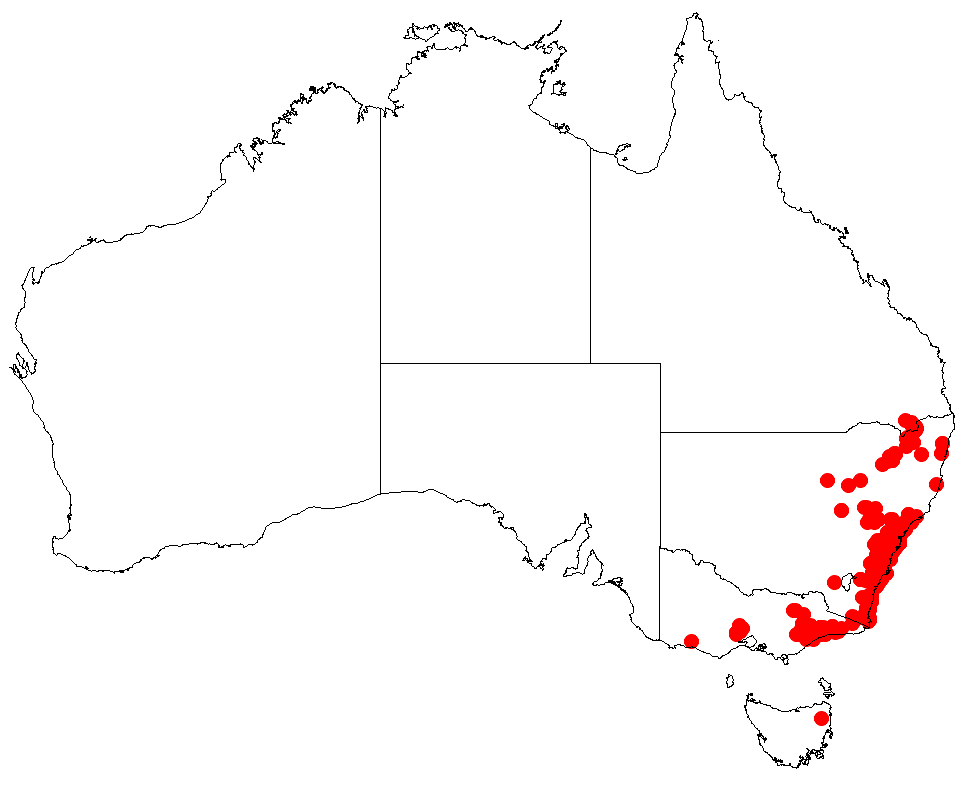
- Occurrence data from AVH

Synonyms
- Bossiaea microphylla (Sims) Sm.; Platylobium microphyllum Sims; Platylobium obcordatum Vent.

= Bossiaea obcordata =

Spiny bossiaea

Species of legume

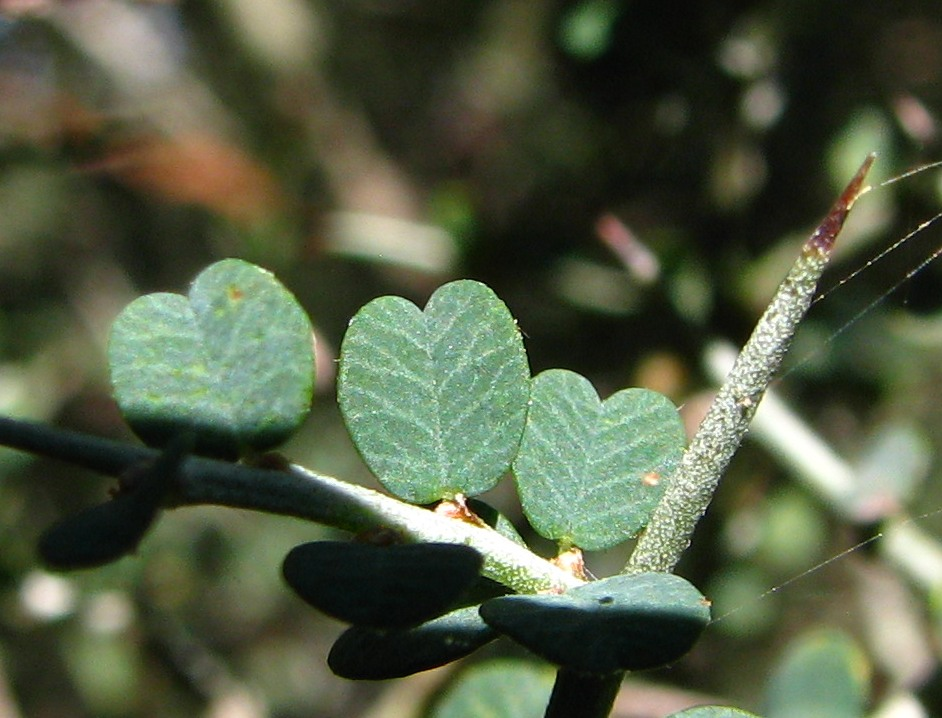
Leaves

Bossiaea obcordata, commonly known as spiny bossiaea, is a species of flowering plant in the family Fabaceae and is endemic to south-eastern continental Australia. It is an erect, rigid shrub with spiny branches, heart-shaped to egg-shaped with the narrower end towards the base, and yellow and purplish-brown flowers.

== Description ==
Bossiaea obcordata is an erect, rigid shrub that typically grows to a height of up to 1.5 m (4 ft 11 in) and has flattened branchlets that become spiny with age. The leaves are arranged alternately along the stems, broadly egg-shaped to heart-shaped with the narrower end towards the base, sometimes almost round, 30–60 mm (1.2–2.4 in) long and wide on a petiole 0.5–1.5 mm (0.020–0.059 in) long with narrow triangular stipules 1–2 mm (0.039–0.079 in) long at the base. The flowers are mostly 8–10 mm (0.31–0.39 in) long and arranged singly along the branches, each flower on a pedicel up to 5 mm (0.20 in) long. The sepals are 3–5 mm (0.12–0.20 in) long with bracteoles up to 2 mm (0.079 in) long on the pedicel. The standard petal is yellow with a red base and up to 10 mm (0.39 in) long, the wings usually purplish-brown and about 2.5 mm (0.098 in) wide and the keel pinkish to red and 3–4 mm (0.12–0.16 in) wide. Flowering occurs from September to October and the fruit is a narrow oblong pod 15–20 mm (0.59–0.79 in) long.

== Taxonomy ==
Spiny bossiaea was first formally described in 1804 by Étienne Pierre Ventenat who gave it the name Platylobium obcordatum in his book, Le Jardin de la Malmaison. In 1917, George Claridge Druce changed the name to Bossia obcordata and the new name is accepted by the Australian Plant Census. The specific epithet (obcordata) refers to the obcordate shape of the leaves.

== Distribution and habitat ==
Bossiaea obcordata grows in forest and heath, often on dry sandstone ridges and slopes. It is found from far south-eastern Queensland through the coast, western slopes and tablelands of eastern New South Wales, to central and eastern Victoria. Specimens recorded from Tasmania are now included in Bossiaea tasmanica.
