= Cape Riche Homestead =

Homestead in Western Australia

Coordinates: 34°36′29.8″S 118°44′59.8″E

Cape Riche Homestead also known as Moirs Property is a building situated at Cape Riche approximately 120 kilometres (75 mi) east of Albany in the Great Southern region of Western Australia.

George Cheyne took up land in the area in 1836. He moved to the area in 1842 to trade with whalers in the area. He also introduced the Moir family, relatives of his from Scotland, to the area, with his nephew Andrew Moir arriving in 1841. Moir acquired the property from his uncle in 1858.

The homestead and out-buildings were constructed between 1850 and 1850. The walls were built using locally cut stone that is 45 centimetres (18 in) thick. A billiards room was built by John Moir with the assistance of Aboriginal people, with a blacksmith shop built at around the same time. Much of the furniture was fashioned from driftwood found on the nearby beaches.

== See also ==
- List of places on the State Register of Heritage Places in the City of Albany
