= Doubtful Islands =

Islands in Western Australia

Coordinates: 34°22′37″S 119°36′40″E

Location of Doubtful Islands

Doubtful Islands are a group of three small islands located approximately 3 kilometres (2 mi) offshore of Point Hood and approximately 20 kilometres (12 mi) east of Bremer Bay in Western Australia.

The islands occupy an area of approximately 170 hectares (420 acres) and are found at the southern end of Doubtful Islands Bay in the Great Southern region.

The islands were named by George Vancouver in 1791, the name derived from his doubt that these were islands at all. Matthew Flinders confirmed that the group were islands in 1802 while on expedition in the area.

Two whaling stations were established around the islands in 1837, one by George Cheyne and the other by Thomas Booker Sherratt.

John Thomas, the owner of a whaling fleet based at Cheyne Beach, often hunted for right whales around Doubtful Islands in October and November in the early 1860s. Another whaler named John MacKenzie lost two of his crew off Doubtful Islands when attacked by a small whale.

In 2003, nine badly gashed sperm whales were washed up on reefs near the island. Six of the whales were dead and the others had to be euthanised.

New Zealand fur seals are known to inhabit the island although the population has nearly halved between 1999 and 2011 despite an overall population increase along the south coast of Western Australia.

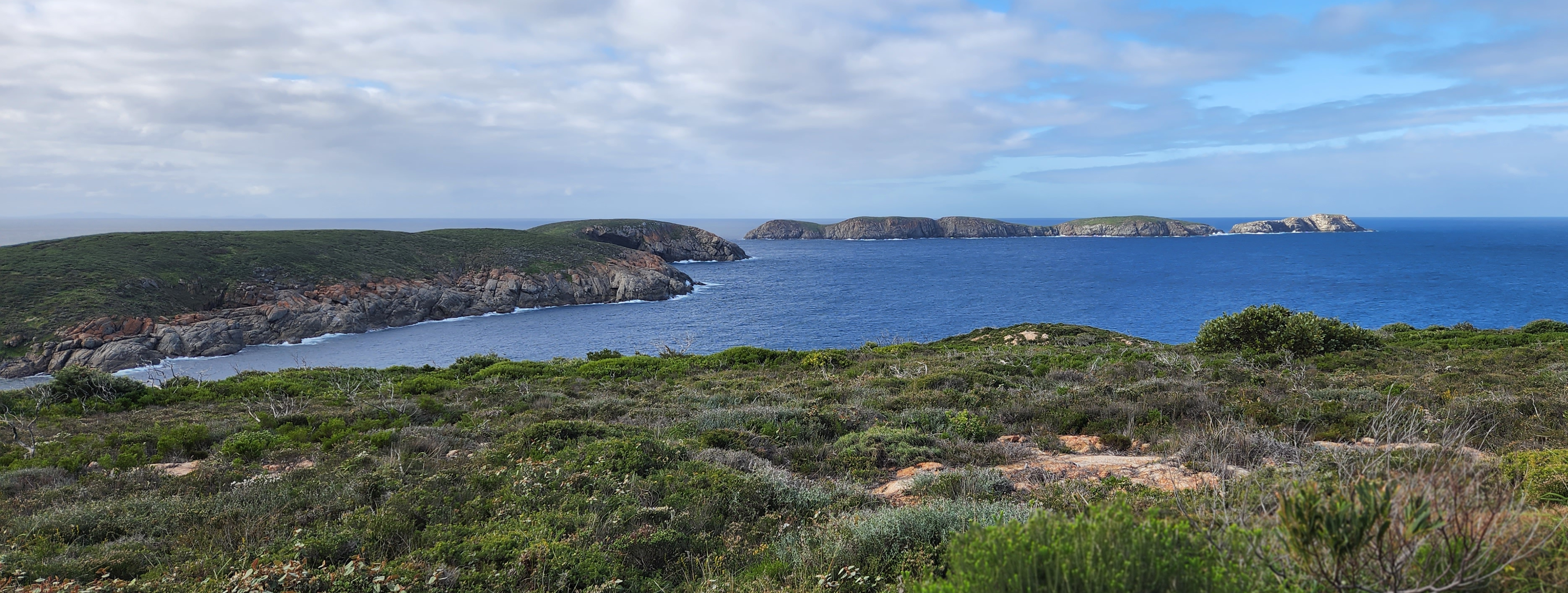
Doubtful Islands
