= Drosera purpurascens =

Scientific classification
- Kingdom: Plantae
- Clade: Tracheophytes
- Clade: Angiosperms
- Clade: Eudicots
- Order: Caryophyllales
- Family: Droseraceae
- Genus: Drosera
- Subgenus: Drosera subg. Ergaleium
- Section: Drosera sect. Stolonifera
- Species: D. purpurascens

Binomial name
- Drosera purpurascens Schlotth.

Synonyms
- D. stolonifera subsp. compacta N.G.Marchant

Species of carnivorous plant

Drosera purpurascens is a compact tuberous perennial species in the genus Drosera that is endemic to south-west Western Australia. It produces 1 erect or 2 to 5 semi-erect lateral stems that grow to 3 to 10 cm long. The compact size of the plant combined with relatively long petioles distinguish it from all other members of the section Stolonifera. It is native to a region from Mount Cooke to near Katanning and Ongerup south to the Denmark-Albany region. It grows in sand-laterite soils and flowers from July to October, flowering en masse after bushfires.

It was first formally described by August Friedrich Schlotthauber in 1856. In 1982 N. G. Marchant described a subspecies of D. stolonifera that was later reduced to synonymy with D. purpurascens.

== See also ==
- List of Drosera species
