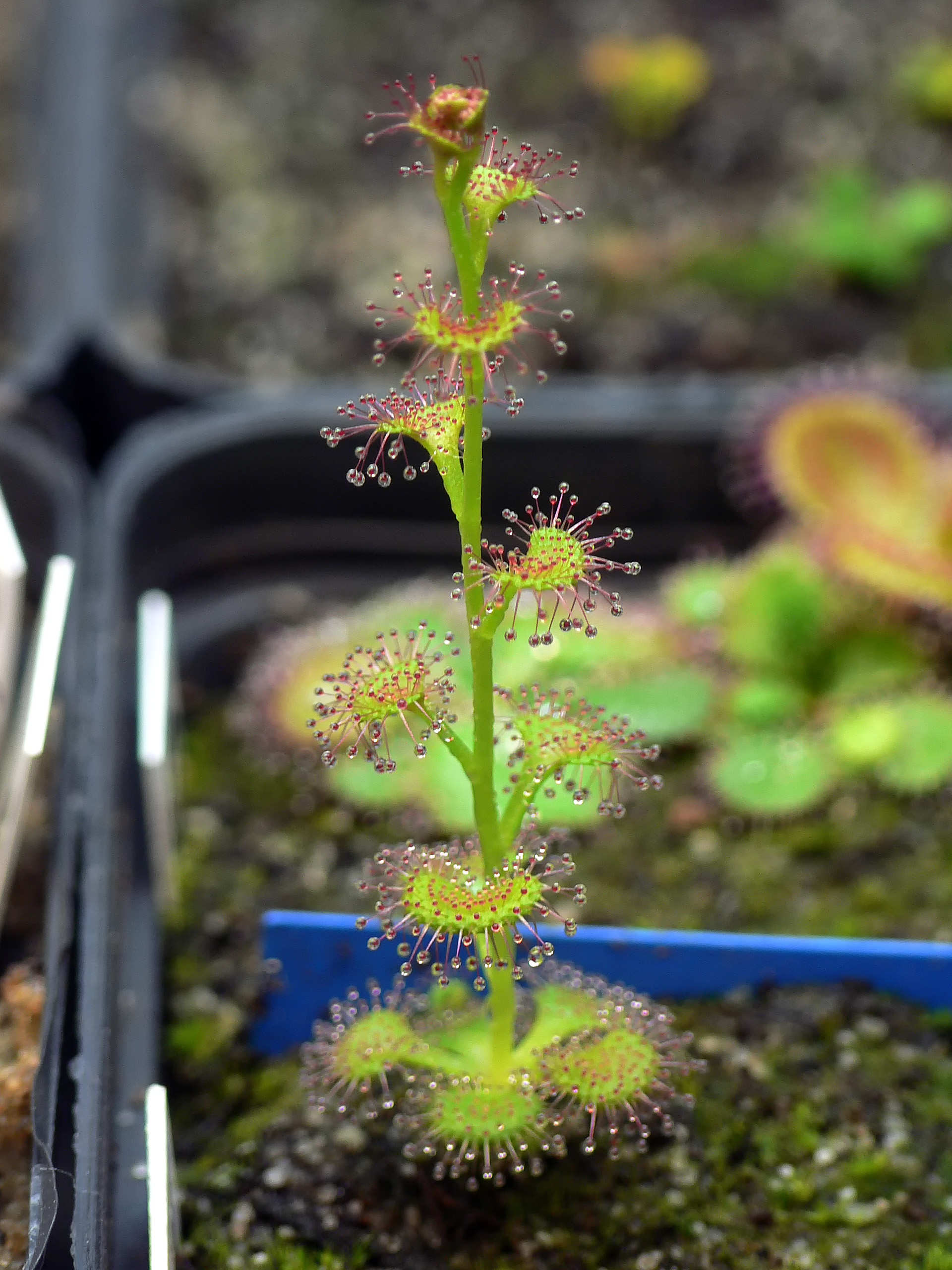
- Drosera platypoda

Scientific classification
- Kingdom: Plantae
- Clade: Tracheophytes
- Clade: Angiosperms
- Clade: Eudicots
- Order: Caryophyllales
- Family: Droseraceae
- Genus: Drosera
- Subgenus: Drosera subg. Ergaleium
- Section: Drosera sect. Stolonifera; DeBuhr

Type species
- D. stolonifera Endl.

Species
- See text

Synonyms
- Drosera subser. Stoloniferae Planch. (as Stolmiferae)

= Drosera sect. Stolonifera =

Group of carnivorous plant species

Drosera sect. Stolonifera is a section of ten tuberous perennial species in the genus Drosera that are endemic to south-west Western Australia. The species all have a similar growth habit and all have fan-shaped leaves, but the morphological differences and lack of natural hybrids support the division of the D. stolonifera species complex.

== Taxonomy ==
The first species in the section was discovered by Charles von Hügel in the Swan River region in 1833. D. stolonifera was formally described by Stephan Endlicher in 1837. Johann Georg Christian Lehmann followed that with two more species in 1844: D. ramellosa and D. porrecta. In 1848, Jules Émile Planchon organized these three species under section Ergaleium series Erythrorhizae subseries Stoloniferae (initially spelled Stolmiferae). Planchon also added the species D. humilis and D. penduliflora (later reduced to synonymy under D. ramellosa) to the new subseries. D. platypoda was added in 1854 by Nicolai Stepanovitch Turczaninow and D. purpurascens, described by August Friedrich Schlotthauber followed in 1856. In 1864, George Bentham reorganized the species under section Ergaleium, recognized fewer taxa, and suggested the reclassification of D. humilis as a variety of D. stolonifera. In 1906, Ludwig Diels took Bentham's suggestion and reduced D. humilis to the variety rank. In Diels' monograph of the family, he reorganized the species in this section into subgenus Ergaleium section Erythrorhiza.

The next new member of the section came when Larry Eugene DeBuhr described D. fimbriata in 1975. Two years later DeBuhr re-evaluated the classification of subgenus Ergaleium and established the current three sections and also formally established the current section Stolonifera, which was based on Planchon's subseries Stoloniferae. At this point, section Stolonifera contained four species: D. fimbriata, D. platypoda, D. ramellosa, and D. stolonifera.

In 1982, N. G. Marchant's treatment of the section included DeBuhr's four species but also four subspecies of D. stolonifera. Subsequent publications identified three additional subspecies of D. stolonifera, two of which were new taxa. Allen Lowrie, one of the coauthors of some of those subspecies, elevated all of the D. stolonifera subspecies to species rank, bringing the total number of species in the section to ten. In his 2005 revision of the section, however, he neglected to include a full basionym citation when elevating D. stolonifera subsp. monticola to D. monticola, thus rendering the new species name invalid due to Article 33.4 of the International Code of Botanical Nomenclature. Therefore, the section then had nine species with two accepted subspecies of D. stolonifera, which includes the autonym D. stolonifera subsp. stolonifera. Lowrie corrected this error in a short note in the 2011 volume of the journal Nuytsia where he provided the correct page number for the basionym and finally validated the name Drosera monticola, bringing the total number of species to ten.

== Species ==
Image	Scientific name	Distribution
	Drosera fimbriata DeBuhr	Western Australia
	Drosera humilis Planch.	Western Australia
	Drosera monticola (Lowrie & N.G.Marchant) Lowrie	Western Australia
	Drosera platypoda Turcz.	south-west Western Australia
	Drosera porrecta Lehm.	Western Australia.
	Drosera prostrata (N.G.Marchant & Lowrie) Lowrie	Western Australia.
	Drosera purpurascens Schlotth.	Western Australia.
	Drosera ramellosa Lehm.	Western Australia.
	Drosera rupicola (N.G.Marchant) Lowrie	Western Australia.
	Drosera stolonifera Endl.	Western Australia

== See also ==
- List of Drosera species
