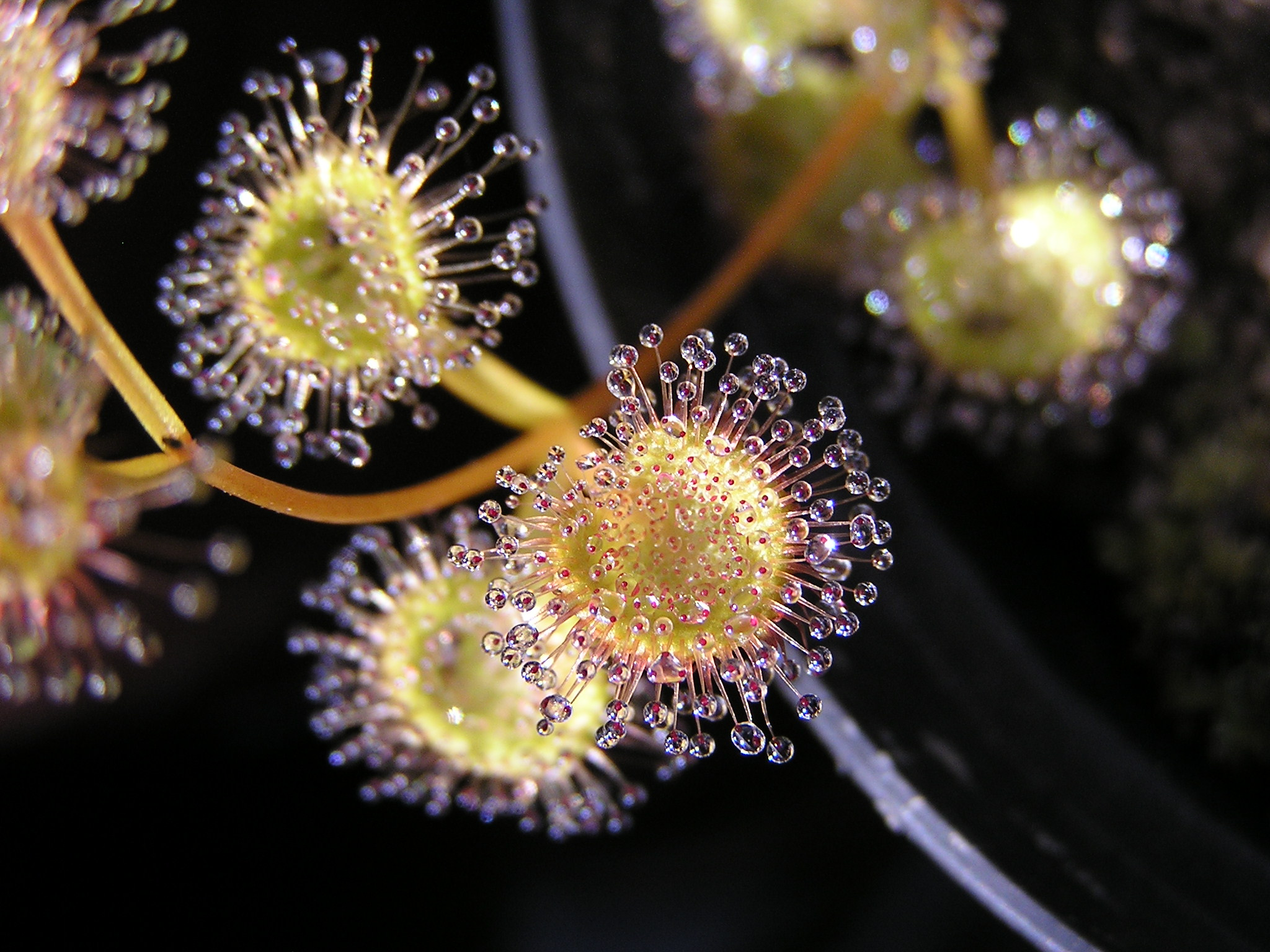

Conservation status
- Least Concern (IUCN 3.1)

Scientific classification
- Kingdom: Plantae
- Clade: Tracheophytes
- Clade: Angiosperms
- Clade: Eudicots
- Order: Caryophyllales
- Family: Droseraceae
- Genus: Drosera
- Subgenus: Drosera subg. Ergaleium
- Section: Drosera sect. Stolonifera
- Species: D. ramellosa

Binomial name
- Drosera ramellosa Lehm.

Synonyms
- Sondera ramellosa (Lehm.) Chrtek & Slavíková; Drosera penduliflora Planch.

= Drosera ramellosa =

Species of carnivorous plant

Drosera ramellosa is a species of carnivorous plant in the family Droseraceae. It is sometimes referred to as the branched sundew, and is a tuberous perennial species that is endemic to Western Australia. It was first formally described by Johann Georg Christian Lehmann in 1844. It was again described by Jules Émile Planchon as Drosera penduliflora in 1848, which was reduced to synonymy under D. ramellosa in 1864 by George Bentham.

== Overview ==
It produces 1 to 3 erect stems that grow to 4 to 12 cm tall. The erect major stems that possess only alternate leaves with inflorescences emerging from the basal rosette distinguish it from all other members of the section Stolonifera. It is native to large region from Kalbarri south to Cranbrook and east to Mount Ragged. It grows in winter-wet sandy or sand-clay soils and flowers from July to September.

== See also ==
- List of Drosera species
