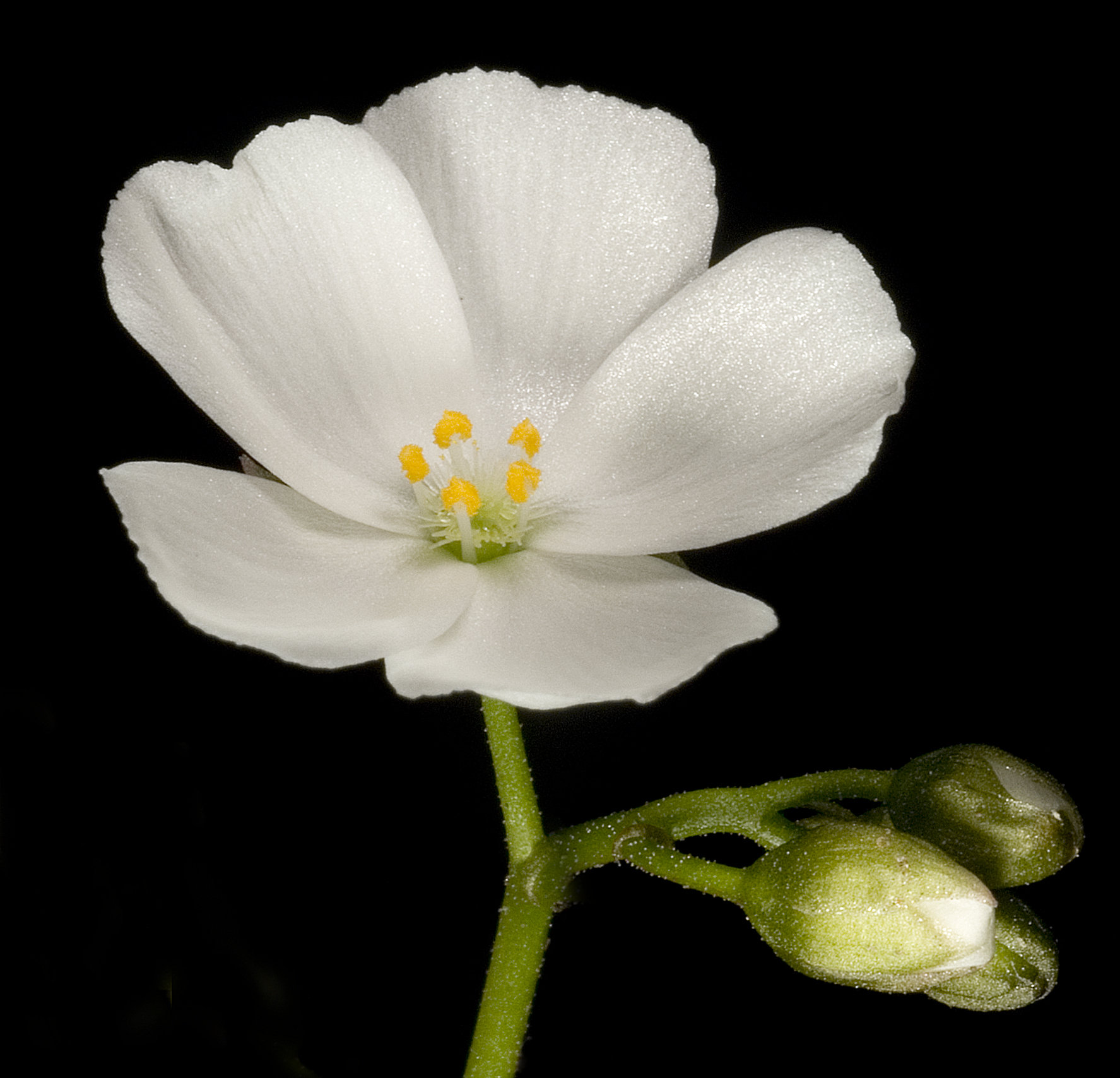

Conservation status
- Least Concern (IUCN 3.1)

Scientific classification
- Kingdom: Plantae
- Clade: Tracheophytes
- Clade: Angiosperms
- Clade: Eudicots
- Order: Caryophyllales
- Family: Droseraceae
- Genus: Drosera
- Subgenus: Drosera subg. Ergaleium
- Section: Drosera sect. Stolonifera
- Species: D. porrecta

Binomial name
- Drosera porrecta Lehm.

Synonyms
- Drosera stolonifera subsp. porrecta (Lehm.) N.G.Marchant & Lowrie; Sondera porrecta (Lehm.) Chrtek & Slavíková

= Drosera porrecta =

Species of carnivorous plant

Drosera porrecta is a species of perennial plant in the family Droseraceae. It is endemic to Western Australia. It grows up to 45 cm tall. It is native to a region from Eneabba and Marchagee south to an area around Pinjarra, including the Darling Range and Mount Cooke. It is a tuberous species that grows in well-drained sandy soils and flowers from July to September.

It was first formally described by Johann Georg Christian Lehmann in 1844, though its position as a subspecies of D. stolonifera has been published. Differences in morphology and the absence of hybrids between D. stolonifera and D. porrecta suggest the current species level designation is the most appropriate choice for this taxon.

== See also ==
- List of Drosera species
