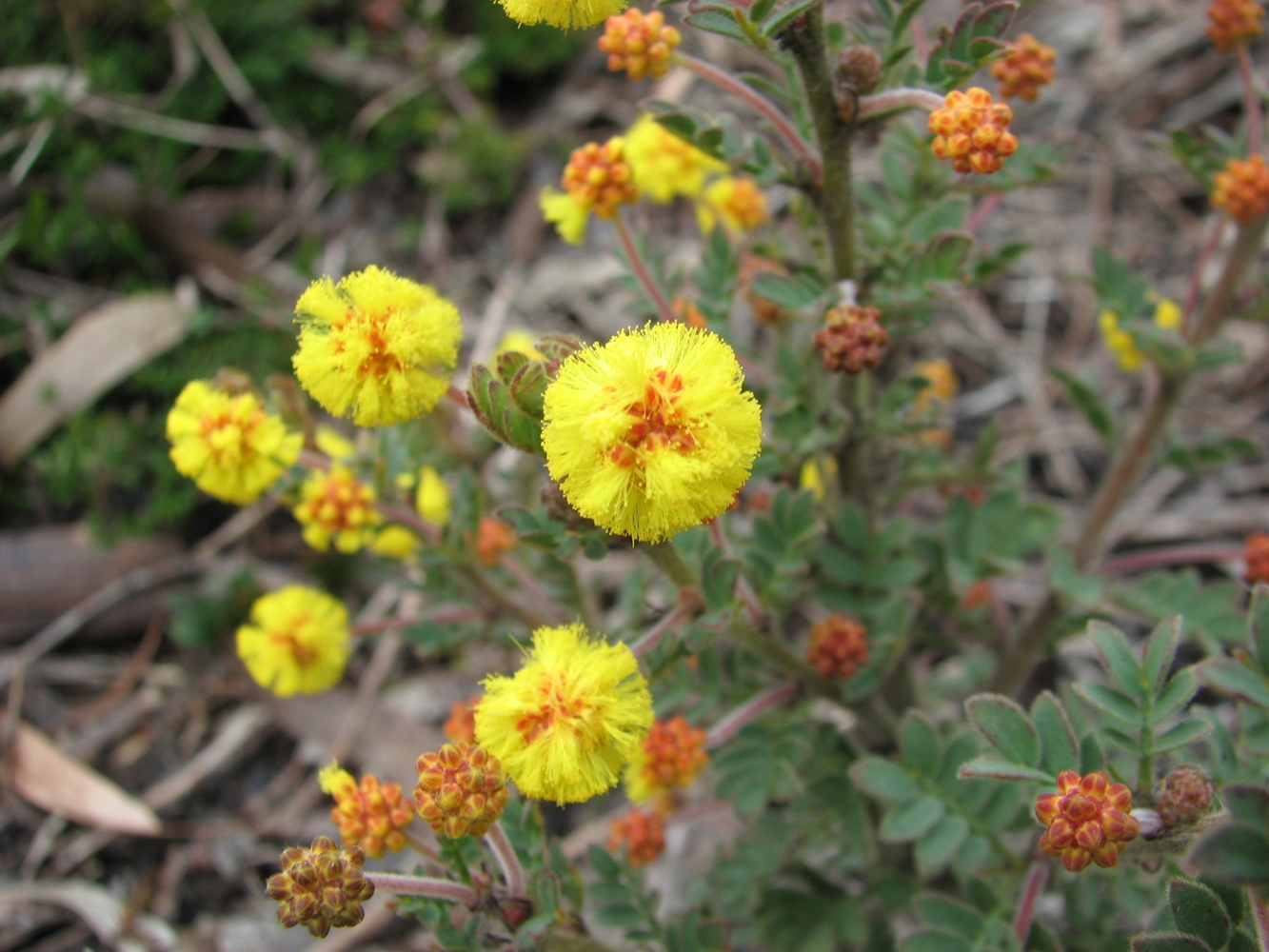
- Subsp. dasycarpa in the Royal Botanic Gardens, Cranbourne

Scientific classification
- Kingdom: Plantae
- Clade: Tracheophytes
- Clade: Angiosperms
- Clade: Eudicots
- Clade: Rosids
- Order: Fabales
- Family: Fabaceae
- Subfamily: Caesalpinioideae
- Clade: Mimosoid clade
- Genus: Acacia
- Species: A. moirii

Binomial name
- Acacia moirii E.Pritz.
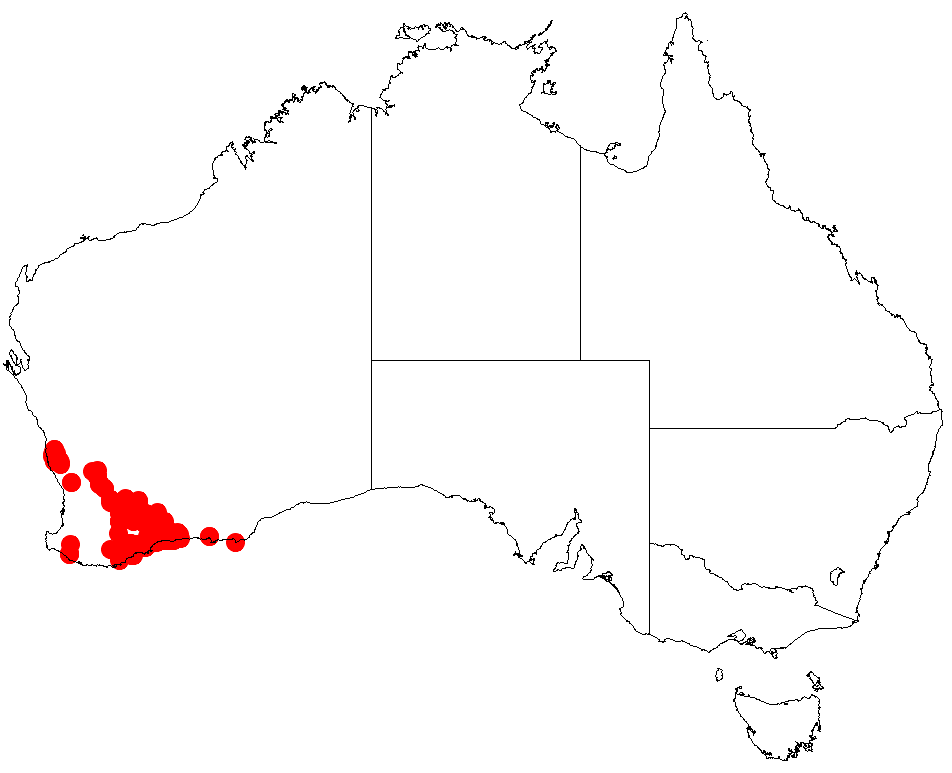
- Occurrence data from AVH

Synonyms
- Racosperma moirii (E.Pritz.) Pedley

= Acacia moirii =

Species of legume

Acacia moirii, commonly known as Moir's wattle, is a species of flowering plant in the family Fabaceae, and is endemic to the south-west of Western Australia. It is a subshrub with branchlets that are rather rigid, bipinnate leaves with curved or spiny hairs on the end, spherical heads of golden yellow flowers, and shaggy hairy pods.

== Description ==
Acacia moirii is a subshrub that typically grows to a height of 15–60 mm (0.59–2.36 in) high and has many stems and rather rigid branchlets. The leaves are bipinnate with one pair of pinna, 5–15 mm (0.20–0.59 in) long on a petiole 1–2 mm (0.039–0.079 in) long, the end often curved down, each pinna with three to seven oblong to narrowly oblong, sometimes egg-shaped to lance-shaped, pinnules up to 10 mm (0.39 in) long and 1–3 mm (0.039–0.118 in) wide. There are spiny or thin, dry membraneous stipules 2–8 mm (0.079–0.315 in) long at the base of the leaves. The flowers are borne in a spherical head in leaf axils on a peduncle 5–20 mm (0.20–0.79 in) long, each head with 15 to 25 golden yellow flowers. Flowering occurs from May to August, and the pods are up to 40 mm (1.6 in) long and 5–6 mm (0.20–0.24 in) wide, containing oblong to elliptic or round seeds about 2–3 mm (0.079–0.118 in) long.

== Taxonomy ==
Acacia moirii was first formally described in 1904 in the journal Botanische Jahrbücher für Systematik, Pflanzengeschichte und Pflanzengeographie from specimens collected near Cape Riche by A.J. Moir.

In 1974, Bruce Maslin described three subspecies of A. moirii and the names are accepted by the Australian Plant Census:

- Acacia moirii subsp. dasycarpa Maslin has pinnules hairy on both surfaces, the stipules are not spiny, and the terminal seta and tip of the pinna-rachis straight.
- Acacia moirii E.Pritz. subsp. moirii has pinnules glabrous or sparsely hairy on margins, the terminal seta and or apex of pinna-rachis often curved down, the stipules are spiny and the pinnules with one obscure veins on the lower surface.
- Acacia moirii E.Pritz. subsp. recurvistipulata has pinnules glabrous or sparsely hairy on margins, the terminal seta and or apex of pinna-rachis often curved down, the stipules are not spiny and the pinnules with a thickened midrib on the lower surface.

== Distribution and habitat ==
This species occurs on sandplains, undulating plains, hills and rises in an area between Eneabba, Manypeaks and Jerdacuttup as well as east of Esperance in the Cape Arid area.

Subspecies dasycarpa grows in sand over laterite in tall shrubland from West River to Jerdacuttup between Newdegate and Lake King, also at Cape Arid. Subspecies moirii occurs from near Borden and Manypeaks to Jerdacuttup where it grows in sand over laterite in tall shrubland. Subspecies recurvisepala grows on sand and lateritic soils in tall shrubland and heath, from Eneabba and south-east to Kukerin and Mount Madden.

== Conservation status ==
All three subspecies of Acacia moirii are listed as 'not threatened' by the Western Australian Government Department Department of Biodiversity, Consevation and Attractions.

== See also ==
- List of Acacia species
