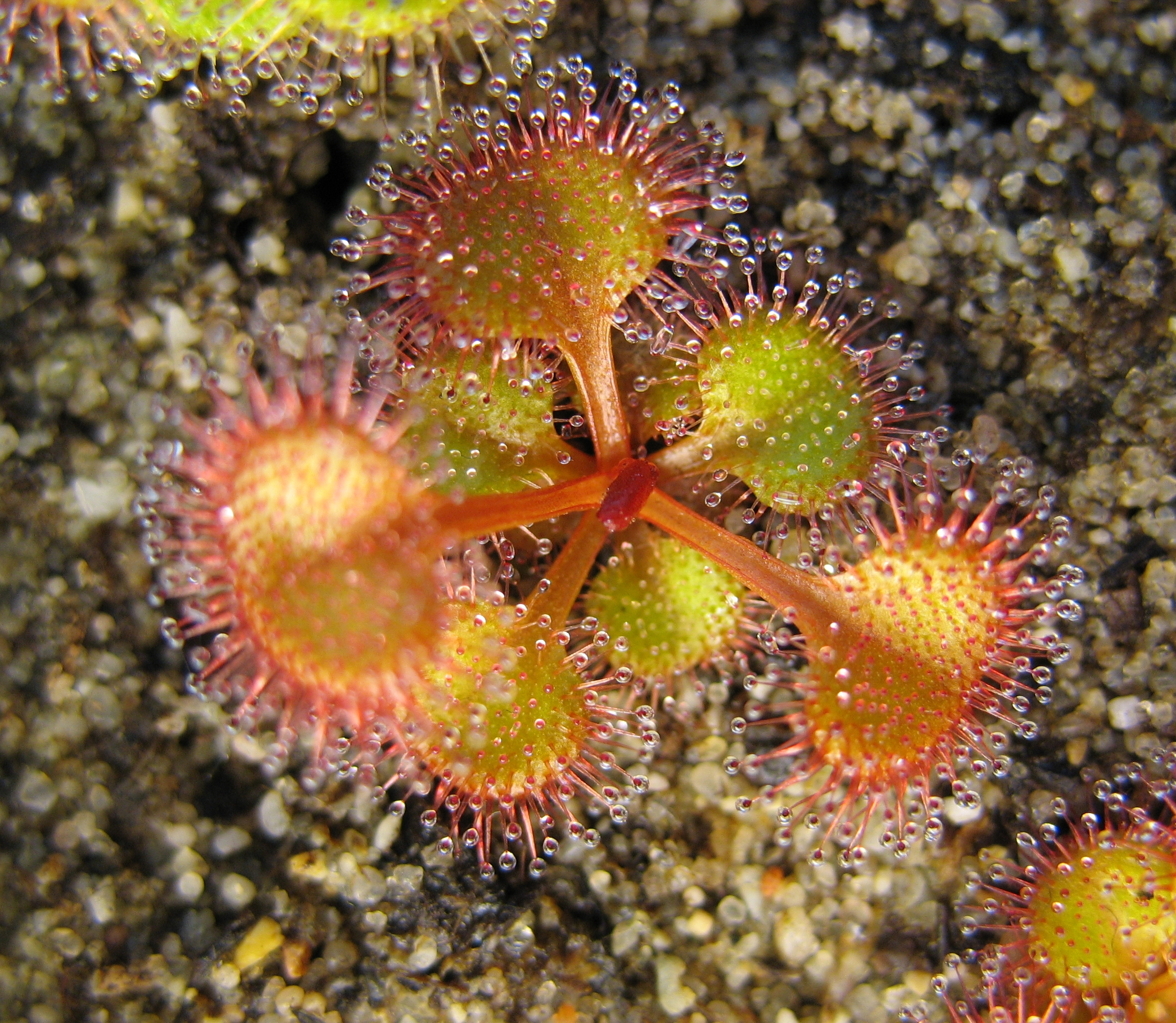

Scientific classification
- Kingdom: Plantae
- Clade: Tracheophytes
- Clade: Angiosperms
- Clade: Eudicots
- Order: Caryophyllales
- Family: Droseraceae
- Genus: Drosera
- Subgenus: Drosera subg. Ergaleium
- Section: Drosera sect. Stolonifera
- Species: D. rupicola

Binomial name
- Drosera rupicola (N.G.Marchant) Lowrie

Synonyms
- D. stolonifera subsp. rupicola N.G.Marchant

= Drosera rupicola =

Species of carnivorous plant

Drosera rupicola is a tuberous perennial species in the genus Drosera that is endemic to Western Australia. It produces 3 to 5 semi-erect lateral stems that grow up to 15 cm long. The turbinate tuber and mobile lamina that are capable of folding over prey distinguish it from all other members of the section Stolonifera. It is native to a large inland region from Pithara to south-east of Hyden. It grows in loamy soils near granite outcrops and flowers from July to October.

It was first formally described by N. G. Marchant in 1982 as a subspecies of D. stolonifera. It was elevated to species rank by Allen Lowrie in 2005.

== See also ==
- List of Drosera species
