= Drosera humilis =

Scientific classification
- Kingdom: Plantae
- Clade: Tracheophytes
- Clade: Angiosperms
- Clade: Eudicots
- Order: Caryophyllales
- Family: Droseraceae
- Genus: Drosera
- Subgenus: Drosera subg. Ergaleium
- Section: Drosera sect. Stolonifera
- Species: D. humilis

Binomial name
- Drosera humilis Planch.

Synonyms
- D. stolonifera var. humilis (Planch.) Diels; D. stolonifera subsp. humilis (Planch.) N.G.Marchant

Species of carnivorous plant

Drosera humilis is a perennial tuberous species in the genus Drosera that is endemic to Western Australia. It has 3 to 5 semi-erect stems that are 3 to 15 cm long with carnivorous leaves arranged in whorls around the stems. It is native to a region from the Moore River north to Kalbarri and east to Ajana and Wongan Hills. It grows in winter-wet sandy soils in heathland. It flowers from June to September.

It was first formally described by Jules Émile Planchon in 1848. Twice the taxon was reorganized and assigned to a taxonomic rank under D. stolonifera, once in 1906 by Ludwig Diels and again in 1982 by Neville Graeme Marchant.

== See also ==
- List of Drosera species
