= Bossiaea preissii =

Scientific classification
- Kingdom: Plantae
- Clade: Tracheophytes
- Clade: Angiosperms
- Clade: Eudicots
- Clade: Rosids
- Order: Fabales
- Family: Fabaceae
- Subfamily: Faboideae
- Genus: Bossiaea
- Species: B. preissii

Binomial name
- Bossiaea preissii Meisn.

Synonyms
- Bossiaea concinna Benth. p.p.; Bossiaea rigida Turcz.

Species of legume

Bossiaea preissii is a species of flowering plant in the family Fabaceae and is endemic to the south of Western Australia. It is a compact, glabrous shrub with egg-shaped leaves with the narrower end towards the base, and yellow, red, orange or apricot-coloured flowers.

== Description ==
Bossiaea preissii is a compact, glabrous shrub that typically grows to a height of 1.4 m (4 ft 7 in) with side shoots ending in a sharp point. The leaves are egg-shaped with the narrower end towards the base, or elliptic, 5.0–9.0 mm (0.20–0.35 in) long and 2.0–3.5 mm (0.079–0.138 in) wide on a petiole 0.5–1.2 mm (0.020–0.047 in) long with narrow triangular stipules 0.3–0.65 mm (0.012–0.026 in) long at the base. The flowers are arranged singly on pedicels 4–10 mm (0.16–0.39 in) long, with one or a few bracts 0.7–2.1 mm (0.028–0.083 in) long at the base. There are oblong bracteoles 1.0–2.8 mm (0.039–0.110 in) long on the pedicels. The five sepals are joined at the base, forming a tube 4.1–5.5 mm (0.16–0.22 in) long, the lobes 1.5–2.0 mm (0.059–0.079 in) but the two upper lobes much broader than the lower lobes. The standard petal is red or yellow, orange or apricot with a red or orange base and 13.0–17.4 mm (0.51–0.69 in) long, the wings 11.0–18.2 mm (0.43–0.72 in) long, and the keel is pinkish or yellow and 12.2–18.2 mm (0.48–0.72 in) long. Flowering occurs from May to October and the fruit is an oblong pod 14–29 mm (0.55–1.14 in) long.

== Taxonomy and naming ==
Bossiaea preissii was first formally described in 1844 by Carl Meissner in Lehmann's Plantae Preissianae from specimens collected at Cape Riche in 1840. The specific epithet (preissii) honours Ludwig Preiss.

== Distribution and habitat ==
This bossiaea usually grows in sand on dunes along the coast and in gravelly soils in low scrub or heathland further inland, in the Avon Wheatbelt, Esperance Plains, Jarrah Forest and Mallee biogeographic regions of southern Western Australia.

== Conservation status ==
Bossiaea preissii is classified as "not threatened" by the Western Australian Government Department of Parks and Wildlife.
