= Drosera fimbriata =

Conservation status
- Priority Four — Rare Taxa (DEC)

Scientific classification
- Kingdom: Plantae
- Clade: Tracheophytes
- Clade: Angiosperms
- Clade: Eudicots
- Order: Caryophyllales
- Family: Droseraceae
- Genus: Drosera
- Subgenus: Drosera subg. Ergaleium
- Section: Drosera sect. Stolonifera
- Species: D. fimbriata

Binomial name
- Drosera fimbriata DeBuhr

Species of carnivorous plant

Drosera fimbriata, the Manypeaks sundew, is a perennial tuberous species in the genus Drosera that is endemic to Western Australia. It grows to 10 to 15 cm tall with two or three whorls of non-carnivorous leaves on the lower portion of the stem and 2 to 5 whorls of carnivorous leaves above that. It is native to a region mostly around Manypeaks but with populations near the Scott River and near Denmark. It grows in winter-wet sandy soils in heathland. It flowers in October.

It was first formally described by Larry Eugene DeBuhr in 1975.

== See also ==
- List of Drosera species
