= George Cheyne (settler) =

George Cheyne (8 April 1790 – 5 June 1869) was an early settler in the Great Southern region of Western Australia.

Cheyne was born in Edinburgh, Scotland, in 1790, the fourteenth of seventeen children. His father, John Cheyne was a doctor and his mother was Margaret Edmonstone.

George Cheyne married Grizzel Melville on 16 December 1830, at the Parish Church, in Clerkenwell, London.

He arrived in Fremantle aboard the Stirling with his wife and daughter, and a cargo of merchandise including a prefabricated house, 14 merinos, cattle and a pair of rabbits. He intended to settle in the area along the Swan or Canning Rivers as a farmer but found the best land was taken. Undeterred he pressed on to King George Sound and found business sites around Albany and selected land around the Kalgan River, Moorilup and on Mistaken Island.

Cheyne acquired land in the Kendenup area in 1832 and Cape Riche in 1836.

In 1839, Cheyne sold 20,000 acres (8,094 ha) of his land around Kendenup to John Hassell, who developed it as Kendenup Estate.

Cheyne moved permanently to Cape Riche in 1842 to trade with the crew of whalers in the area. He also introduced the Moir family, relatives of his from Scotland, to the area, with his nephew Andrew Moir arriving in 1841. Moir acquired the property from his uncle in 1858. In 1837, Cheyne founded his own whaling operation on Doubtful Islands Bay. By 1843, Cheyne was supplying whalers operating at and around his property at Cape Riche with items such as water, fuel, provisions, and fresh meat and vegetables.

His brother, Bruce Cheyne died aged 62, on 7 January 1856 in Albany.

He also acquired more grazing land along the Pallinup River and around Broomehill while establishing himself as a merchant, sandalwooder, whaler and shipchandler. Cheyne built a large granite house in Albany in 1862 then went to England to secure a better deal for his wool from his brokers. He then bought a house in Sussex and sold his Albany house to John Hassell.

Cheyne died in Dumfries, Scotland in 1869.

Several geographical features bear Cheyne's name including:

- Cheyne Creek, a tributary of the Kalgan River
- Cheyne Ledge and Cheyne Head, near Oyster Harbour on the north western side of King George Sound
- Cheyne Island and Cheyne Inlet near Cape Riche
- Cheyne Point near Duke of New Orleans Bay
- Cheyne Beach
