= Cape Riche =

Cape in Western Australia

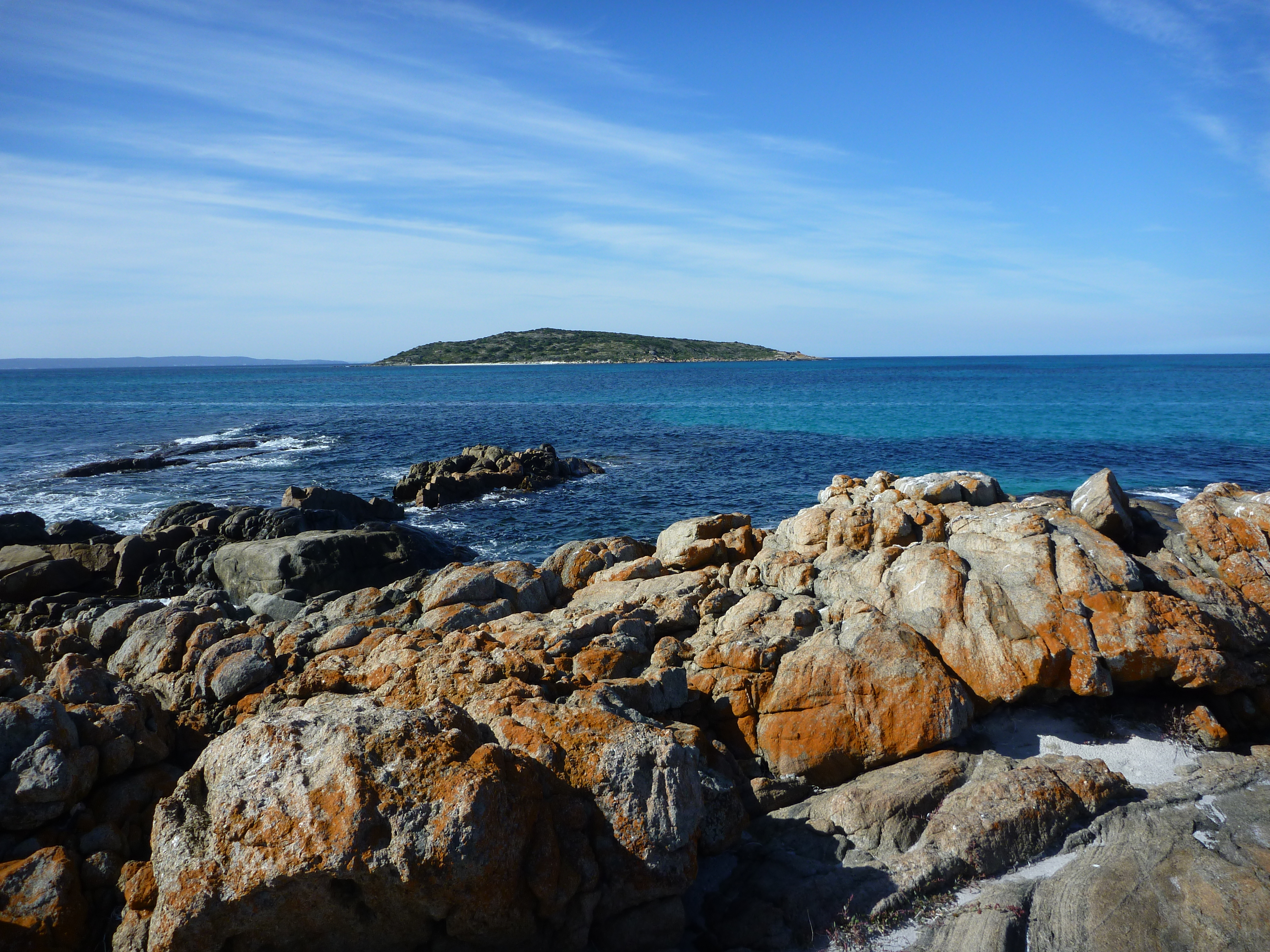
- Cheyne Island off Cape Riche

- Interactive map of Cape Riche
- Coordinates: 34°36′29″S 118°45′00″E
- Country: Australia
- State: Western Australia
- Region: Great Southern
- LGA: City of Albany
- Location: 525 km (326 mi) SE of Perth; 123 km (76 mi) NE of Albany; 24 km (15 mi) S of Wellstead (townsite); 406 km (252 mi) W of Esperance

Government
  - State electorate: Albany
  - Federal division: O'Connor

Cape Riche is a cape in the Great Southern region of Western Australia. By road, it is 525 kilometres (326 mi) south-east of Perth and 123 kilometres (76 mi)north-east of Albany. It is part of the locality of Wellstead and is 24 kilometres (15 mi) south of the townsite.

Facilities in the area include a boat launching ramp and a campground with flushing toilets and showers.

== History ==
Cape Riche was named for Claude-Antoine-Gaspard Riche, a naturalist on Bruni d'Entrecasteaux's 1791 expedition who became lost for two days near Esperance.

Matthew Flinders aboard Investigator charted the area in 1802 as part of his circumnavigation of Australia.

George Cheyne, a Scottish immigrant, took up land at Cape Riche in 1836, after arriving in Albany in 1831. He established a trading post which was often visited by American whalers. In about 1848, sandalwood cutters arrived in the area, The Surveyor-General of Western Australia, John Septimus Roe, visited the Cape in October 1848 as part of this 1848–49 expedition and reorganised his supplies while staying with the Cheyne family. He left four days later to make his way to the Russell Range.

The Cheyne properties were later taken over by the related Moir family. The Cape Riche Homestead, also known as Moirs Property, was designed and built between 1850 and 1860 by Alexander Moir. It comprises a large group of spongolite buildings.

Bay whaling activity took place on the coast in the 1870s.

In the 1890s the schooner Grace Darling provided supplies and delivered the mail on its monthly run between Albany and Esperance.

== Flora and fauna ==
A number of botanists and explorers conducted plant collections in the area in the mid-19th century including Ludwig Preiss (1840), James Drummond (1840, 1846–48) John Septimus Roe (1848) and William Henry Harvey (1854). Plant species which were formally described based on these collections included Moirs wattle (Acacia moirii), sheath cottonhead (Conostylis vaginata), tallerack (Eucalyptus pleurocarpa), autumn featherflower (Verticordia harveyi) and Bossiaea preissii. Ludwig Diels and Ernst Pritzel also collected plant material at Cape Riche in 1901.

Cape Riche is home to a number of rare flora species including feather-leaved banksia (Banksia brownii), Manypeaks rush (Chordifex abortivus), Manypeaks sundew (Drosera fimbriata) and coast featherflower (Verticordia helichrysantha). The Albany/Cape Riche area is noted as a calving area for southern right whales.

== Gallery ==
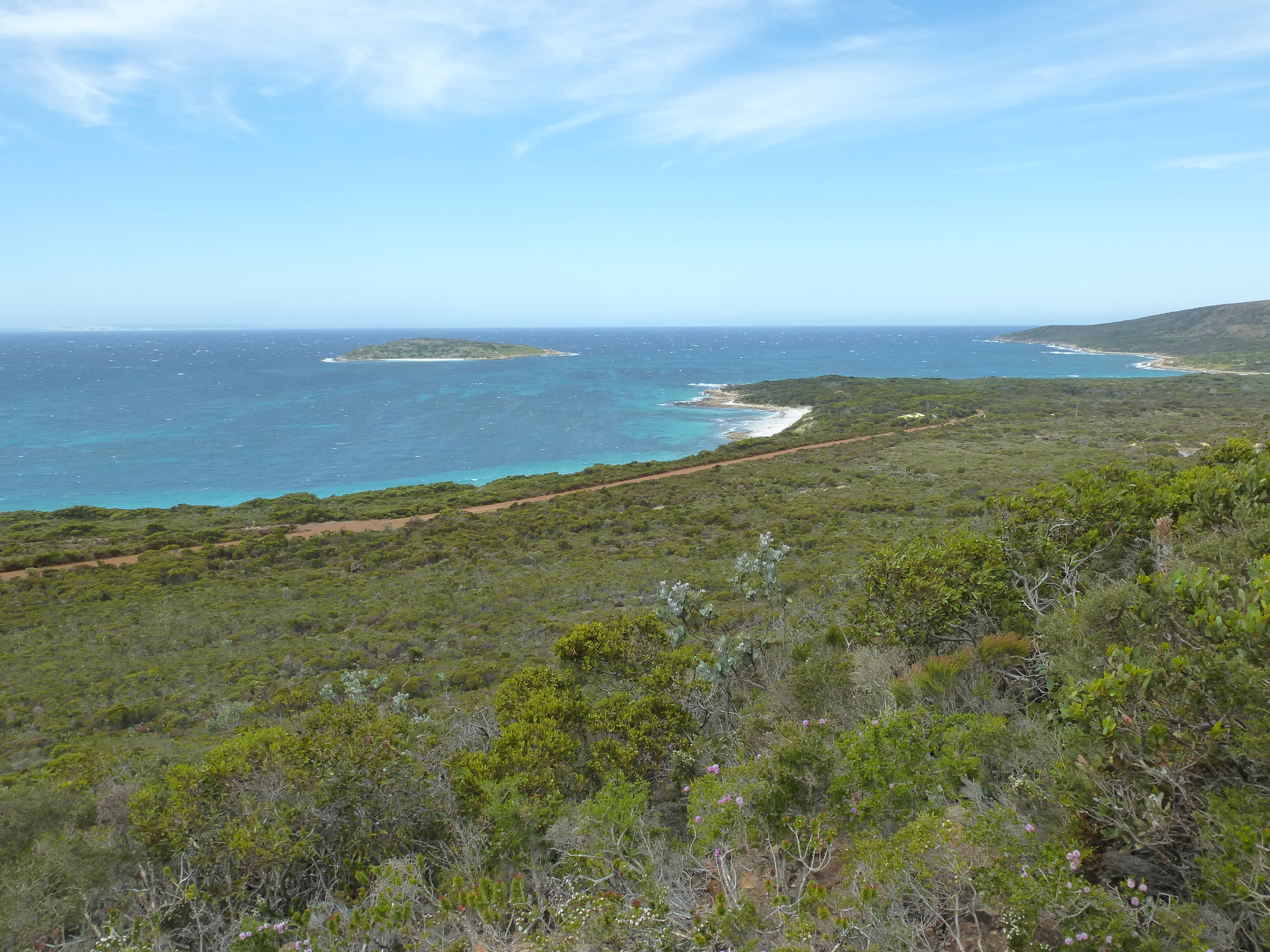
Cape Riche and Cheyne Island from nearby Mount Melville
