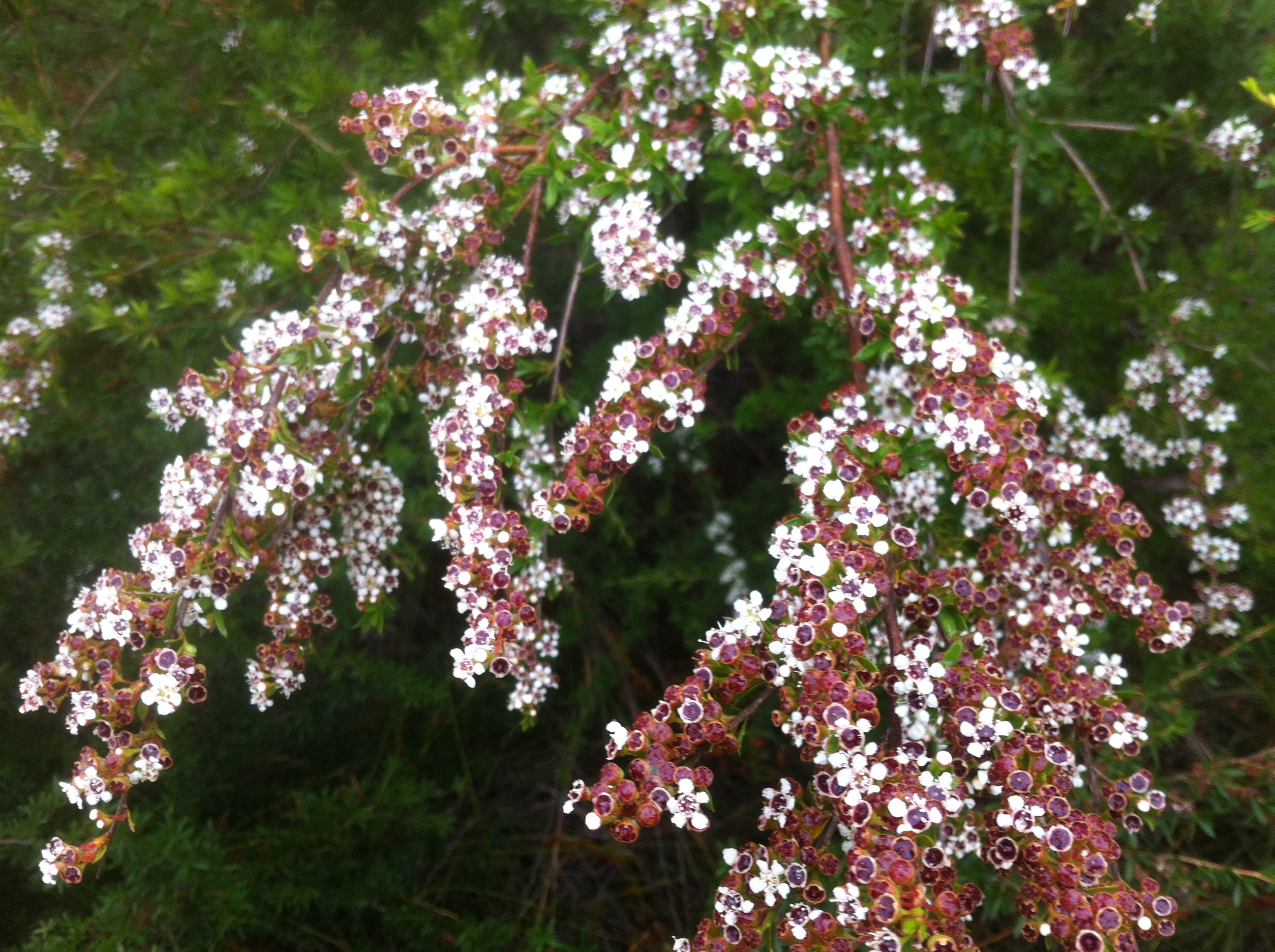

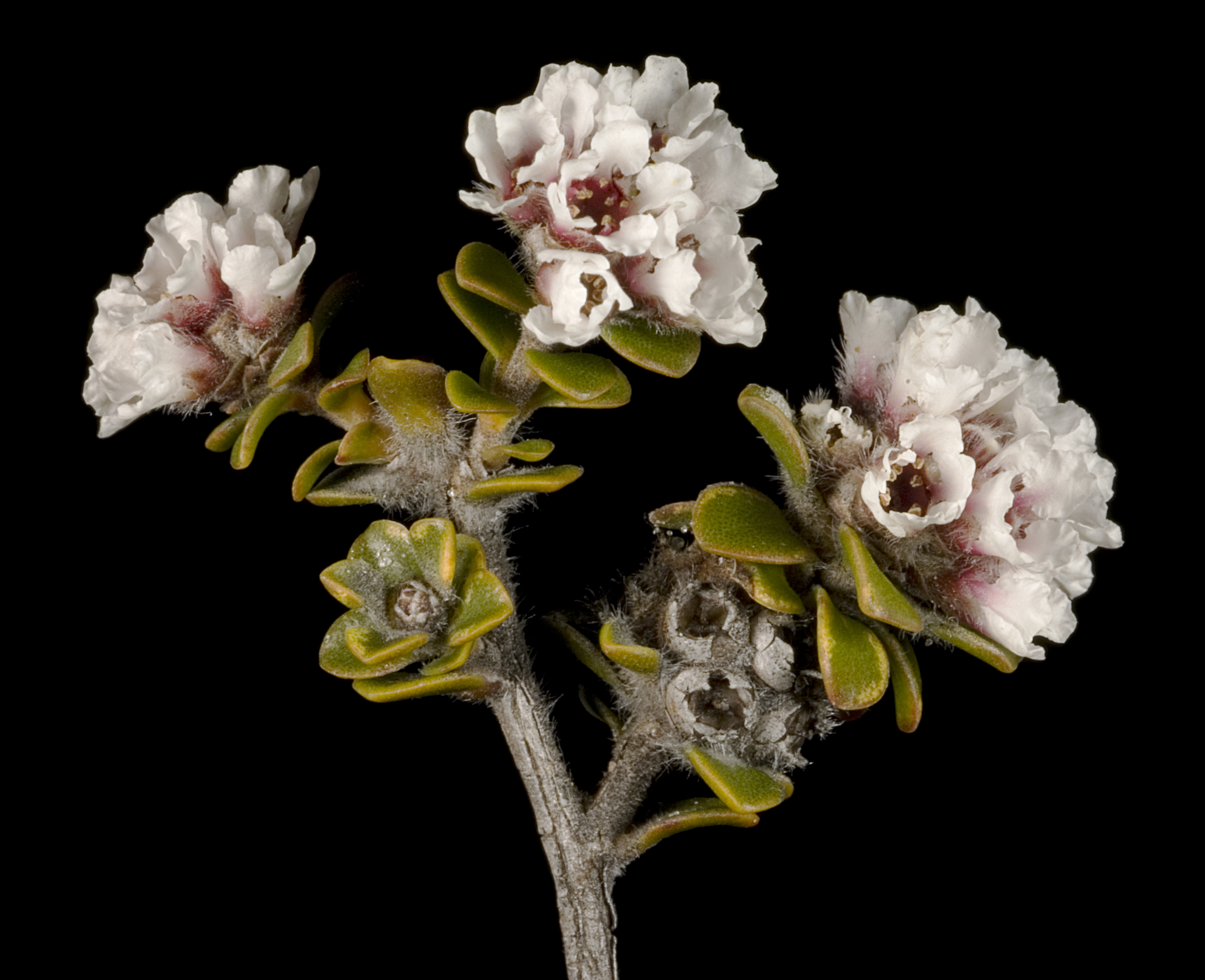

Scientific classification
- Kingdom: Plantae
- Clade: Tracheophytes
- Clade: Angiosperms
- Clade: Eudicots
- Clade: Rosids
- Order: Myrtales
- Family: Myrtaceae
- Genus: Taxandria
- Species: T. spathulata

Binomial name
- Taxandria spathulata (Schauer) J.R.Wheeler & N.G.Marchant

Synonyms
- Agonis spathulata

= Taxandria spathulata =

Species of tree

Taxandria spathulata is a shrub species that grows along the southern coast of Western Australia. This plant was previously classified as Agonis spathulata but is now part of the Taxandria genus.

== Description ==
The shrub has a spindly, erect to spreading and procumbent form, typically growing to a height of 2 metres (7 ft). The leaves are typically 3 to 7 millimetres (0.12 to 0.28 in) in length. It blooms between September and October producing small white petal flowers with a diameter of approximately 1 cm (0.39 in) that appear in dense cluster of about 20 flowers. Each flower contains about 10 stamens, one opposite each sepal and petal.

== Distribution ==
Often found in dense bushland on small hills, low rocky ridges, plains and coastal dunes it is distributed along the south coast in the Great Southern and Goldfields-Esperance regions where it grows in sandy, peaty clay soils over granite, spongelite or laterite.

== Classification ==
First formally described as Agonis spathulata by the botanist Johannes Conrad Schauer in 1844 as part of Johann Georg Christian Lehmann's work Plantae Preissianae The plant was subsequently reclassified to T. spathulata in a 2007 revision by Wheeler and Marchant into the new genus Taxandria.
