= Taxandria angustifolia =

Scientific classification
- Kingdom: Plantae
- Clade: Tracheophytes
- Clade: Angiosperms
- Clade: Eudicots
- Clade: Rosids
- Order: Myrtales
- Family: Myrtaceae
- Genus: Taxandria
- Species: T. angustifolia

Binomial name
- Taxandria angustifolia (Schauer) J.R.Wheeler & N.G.Marchant

Synonyms
- Agonis angustifolia

Species of tree

Taxandria angustifolia is a species of tree that grows on the south coast of Western Australia. This plant was previously classified as Agonis angustifolia but is now part of the Taxandria genus.

The shrub has an erect an often dense form, it typically grows to a height of 3 metres (10 ft). It blooms between June and July producing white flowers.

The species is distinguished from other members of the genera by the leaves which are typically 10 to 23 millimetres (0.39 to 0.91 in) long and are distinctly concave above and convex below. The sepals are usually glabrous or some with sparse hairs.

Often found in swamps, along creeks in verges it has a limited distribution, confined to a small area in the Great Southern region centred around Albany extending from West Cape Howe to Cheyne Beach to where it grows in sandy or loam soils around granite.

First formally described by the botanist Johannes Conrad Schauer in 1844 as part of Johann Georg Christian Lehmann's work Plantae Preissianae The plant was subsequently reclassified to T. angustifolia in a 2007 revision by Wheeler and Marchant into the new genus Taxandria.
