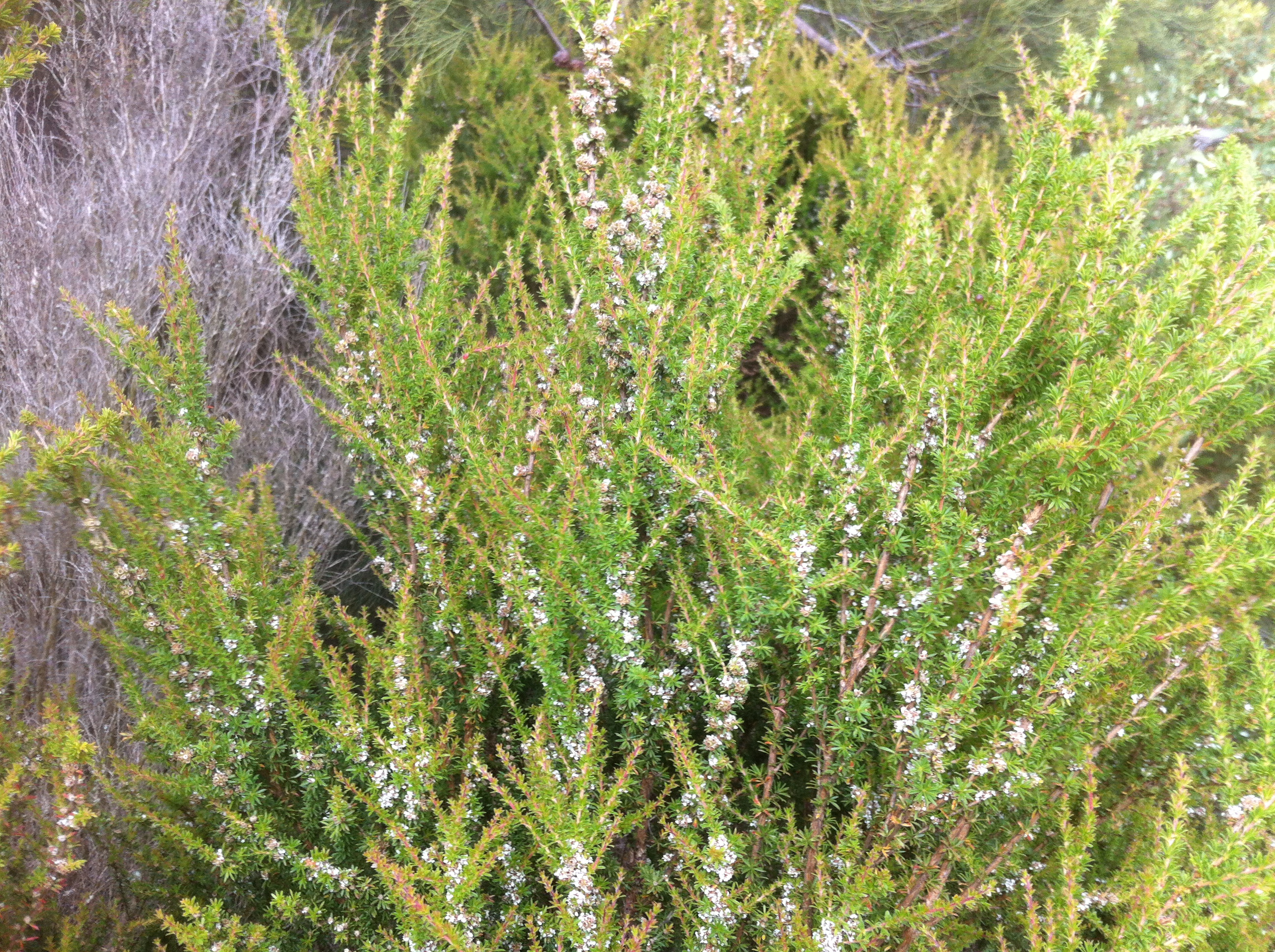
- Taxandria parviceps habit
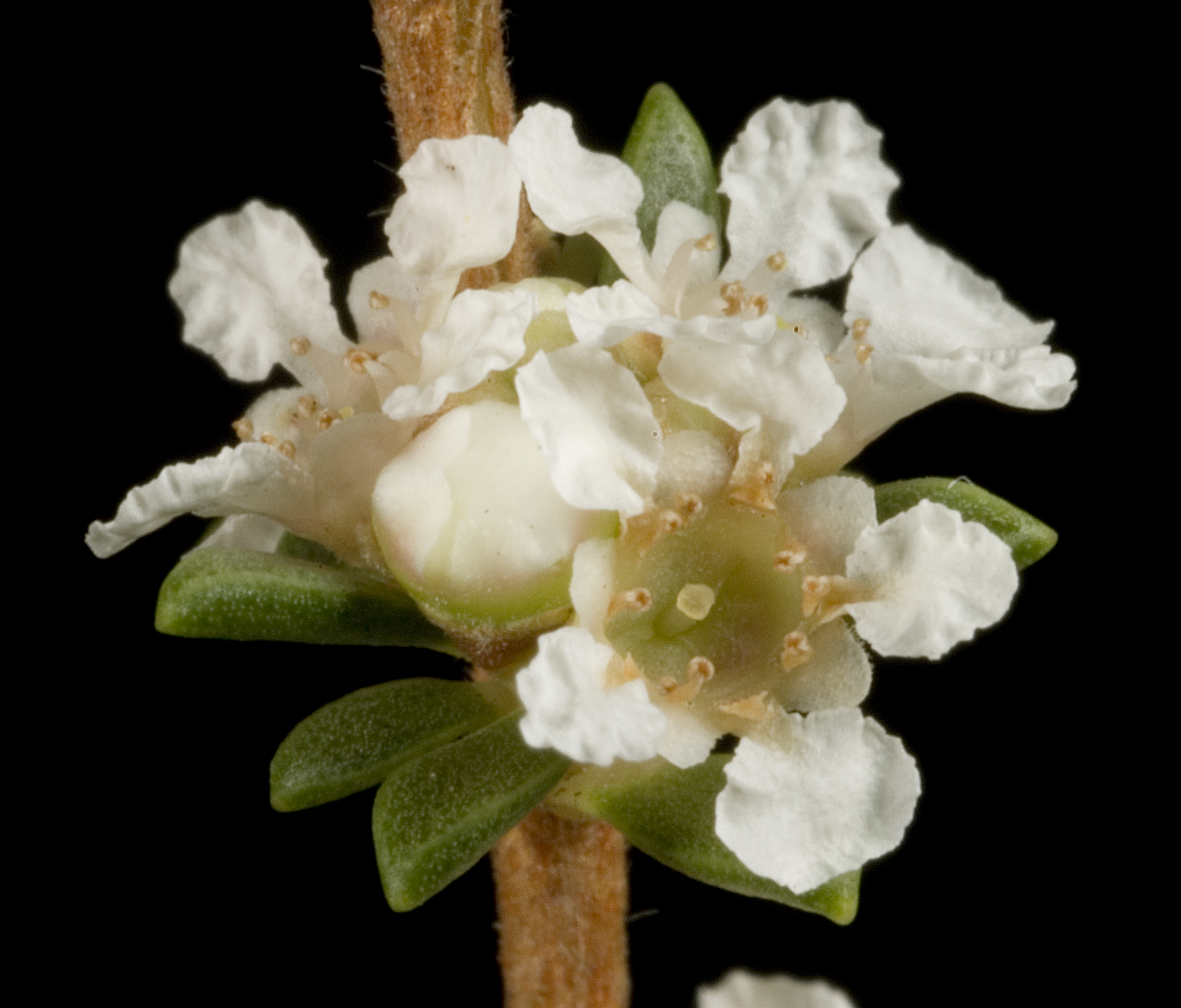

Scientific classification
- Kingdom: Plantae
- Clade: Tracheophytes
- Clade: Angiosperms
- Clade: Eudicots
- Clade: Rosids
- Order: Myrtales
- Family: Myrtaceae
- Genus: Taxandria
- Species: T. parviceps

Binomial name
- Taxandria parviceps (Schauer) J.R.Wheeler & N.G.Marchant

Synonyms
- Agonis parviceps

= Taxandria parviceps =

Species of tree

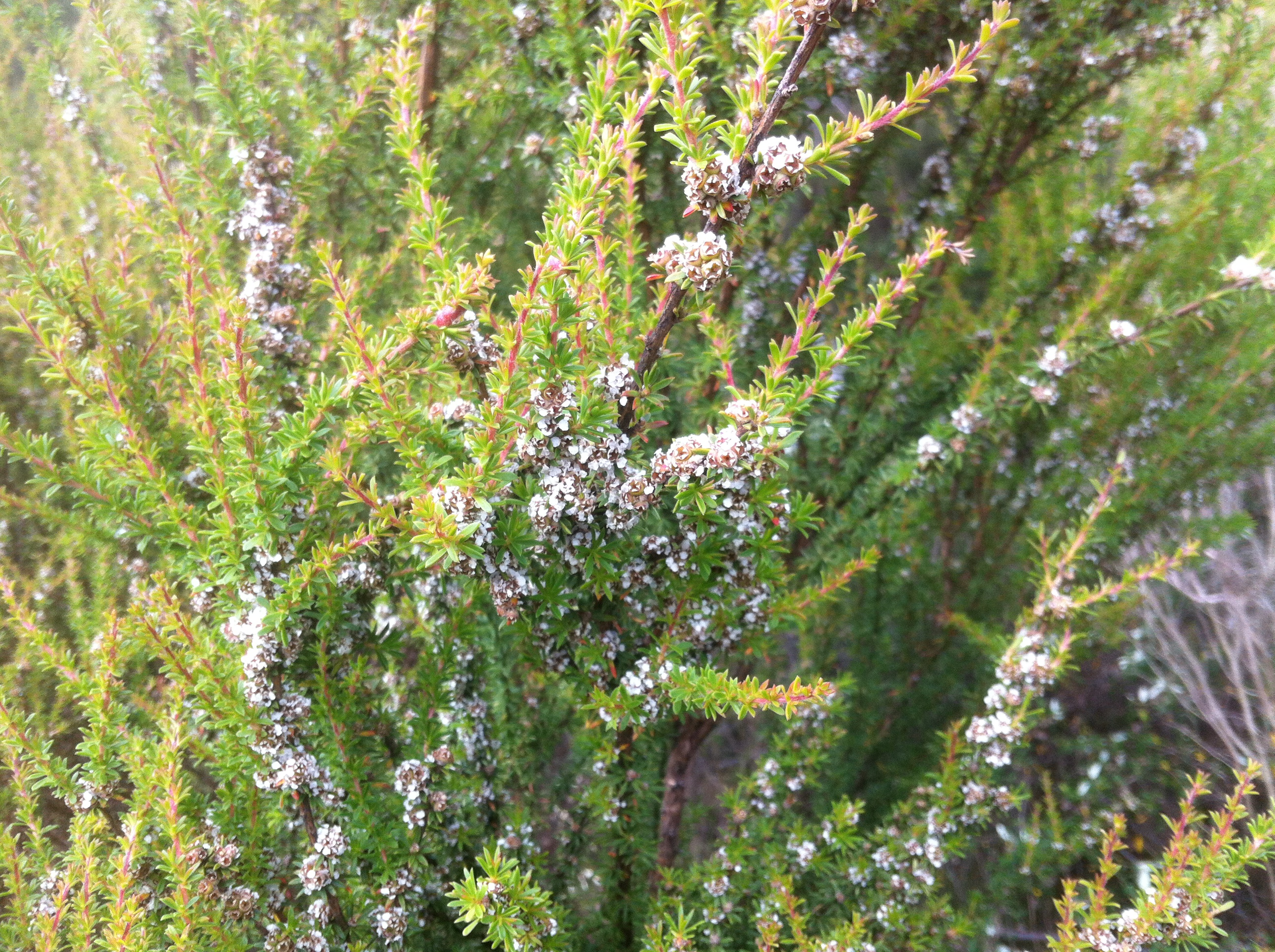
Taxandria parviceps foliage and flowers

Taxandria parviceps, commonly known as tea tree, is a shrub species that grows on the south west coast of Western Australia. This plant was previously classified as Agonis parviceps but is now part of the Taxandria genus.

== Description ==
The shrub has an erect form and typically grows to a height of 3 to 4 metres (10 to 13 ft). It blooms between July and October producing white flowers. It can be grown as an ornamental shrub in the garden where it is hardy and has dense foliage. The small white flowers grow in masses and the foliage is aromatic. The shrub is drought tolerant once established and will also tolerate light frosts.

== Distribution ==
It is often found along the edges of seasonally-wet areas on sand dunes and flats. It has a range along coastal regions extending from the South West region into the Great Southern region where it grows in loamy, sandy or clay soils over quartzite or granite.

== Classification ==
First formally described as Agonis parviceps by the botanist Johannes Conrad Schauer in 1844 as part of Johann Georg Christian Lehmann's work Plantae Preissianae The plant was subsequently reclassified to T. parviceps in a 2007 revision by Wheeler and Marchant into the new genus Taxandria.
