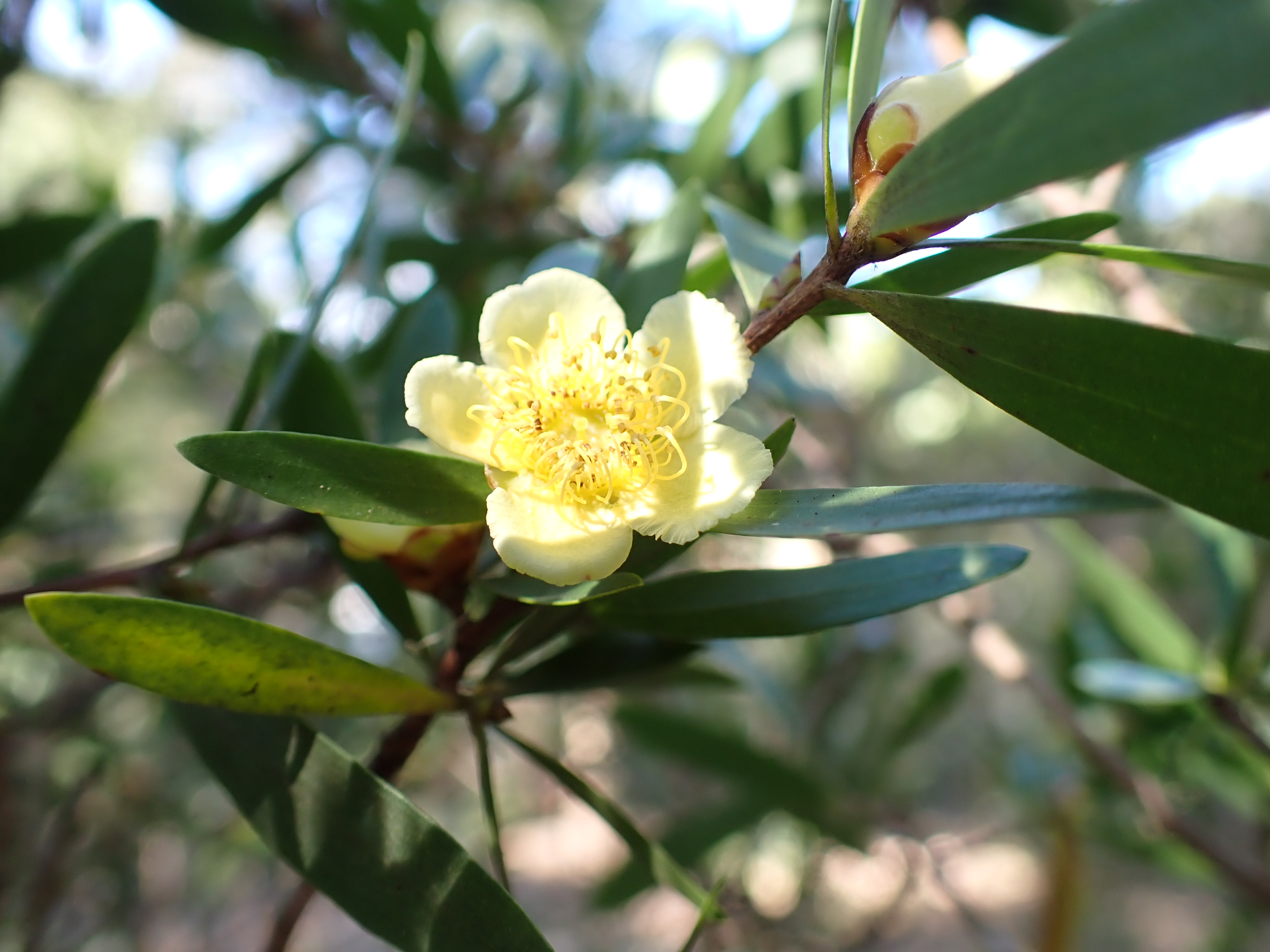
- Neofabricia myrtifolia in Mount Coot-tha Botanic Gardens

Conservation status
- Least Concern (IUCN 3.1)

Scientific classification
- Kingdom: Plantae
- Clade: Tracheophytes
- Clade: Angiosperms
- Clade: Eudicots
- Clade: Rosids
- Order: Myrtales
- Family: Myrtaceae
- Tribe: Leptospermeae
- Genus: Neofabricia
- Species: N. myrtifolia

Binomial name
- Neofabricia myrtifolia (Gaertn.) Joy Thomps.

Synonyms
- Fabricia myrtifolia Gaertn.; Leptospermum fabricia Benth.; Philadelphus myrtifolius Gaertn. nom. inval., pro syn.

= Neofabricia myrtifolia =

Genus of shrubs

Neofabricia myrtifolia is a species of flowering plant in the family Myrtaceae, and is endemic to Queensland. It is a shrub or small tree with lance-shaped or egg-shaped leaves, the narrower end towards the base, yellow flowers borne singly in leaf axils with many stamens, and more or less cup-shaped fruits.

== Description ==
Neofabricia myrtifolia is a shrub or small tree that typically grows to a height of 5 m (16 ft), sometimes 10 m (33 ft) and has hard, almost black bark. The leaves are linear to lance-shaped or egg-shaped with the narrower end towards the base, mostly 35–45 mm (1.4–1.8 in) long, 6–10 mm (0.24–0.39 in) wide and sessile or on a very short petiole. The flowers are borne singly on short shoots at the ends of branches with bracts and bracteoles at the base but that fall off as the flower develop. The floral tube is almost hemispherical, 4–5 mm (0.16–0.20 in) long and 6–8 mm (0.24–0.31 in) wide and hairy. The sepals are more or less round, 3–5 mm (0.12–0.20 in) long and the petals are yellow, more or less round, 8–10 mm (0.31–0.39 in) long. The ovary has 8 to 10 locules and the style is 2.5 mm (0.098 in) long with a stigma 0.8–0.9 mm (0.031–0.035 in) wide. Flowering occurs from May to August, and the fruit is more or less cup-shaped, 7–9 mm (0.28–0.35 in) in diameter containing winged seeds.

== Taxonomy ==
This species was first described in 1788 by Joseph Gaertner, who gave it the name Fabricia myrtifolia in his book De Fructibus et Seminibus Plantarum. In 1983, Joy Thompson transferred the species to Neofabricia as N. myrtifolia in the journal Telopea.

== Distribution and habitat ==
Neofabricia myrtifolia grows on exposed, rocky headlands and in heath on coastal dunes, between Horn Island and Cooktown on Cape York Peninsula at elevations from near sea level to 100 m (330 ft).

== Use in horticulture ==
This pant has horticultural potential because of it large number of large yellow flower, and its ability to grows in a variety of conditions.
