= Taxandria =

Taxandria may refer to

- Taxandria (plant), an Australian genus of shrubs
- Texandria, a region located in the southern Netherlands and northern Belgium during Late antiquity and the Middle Ages
- Taxandria (film), a 1994 Belgian animated film
