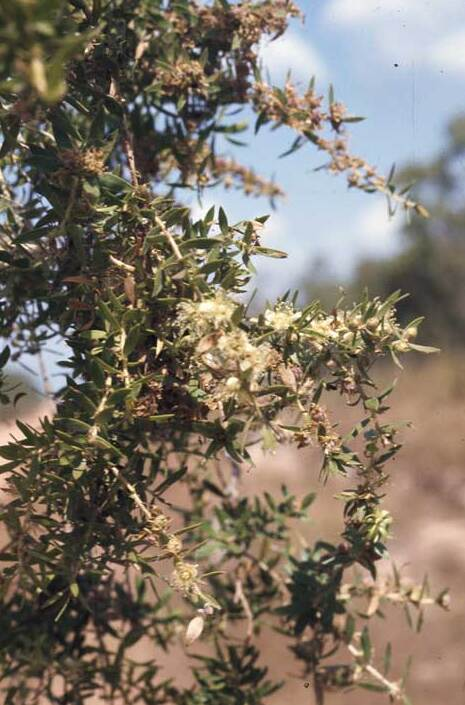
- Near Atherton

Conservation status
- Least Concern (IUCN 3.1)

Scientific classification
- Kingdom: Plantae
- Clade: Tracheophytes
- Clade: Angiosperms
- Clade: Eudicots
- Clade: Rosids
- Order: Myrtales
- Family: Myrtaceae
- Tribe: Leptospermeae
- Genus: Neofabricia
- Species: N. mjoebergii

Binomial name
- Neofabricia mjoebergii (Cheel) Joy Thomps.

Synonyms
- Leptospermum mjoebergii Cheel

= Neofabricia mjoebergii =

Genus of shrubs

Neofabricia mjoebergii is a species of flowering plant in the family Myrtaceae, and is endemic to Cape York Peninsula in Queensland. It is a shrub or small tree with narrowly elliptic, sometimes lance-shaped or egg-shaped leaves with the narrower end towards the base, white or cream-coloured flowers usually borne singly in leaf axils, and broadly conical fruits.

== Description ==
Neofabricia mjoebergii is a shrub or small tree that typically grows to a height of 10 m (33 ft) and has hard, grey bark. The leaves are narrowly elliptic, sometimes lance-shaped or egg-shaped leaves with the narrower end towards the base, mostly 6–10 mm (0.24–0.39 in) long, 2–4 mm (0.079–0.157 in) wide and sessile. The flowers are usually borne singly, rarely in groups of 3, with leaf-like bracteoles. The floral tube is funnel-shaped, 2–3 mm (0.079–0.118 in) long and 3.0–3.5 mm (0.12–0.14 in) wide and hairy. The sepals are broadly egg-shaped, 2–3 mm (0.079–0.118 in) long and the petals are white or cream-coloured, more or less round, 3.5–4.0 mm (0.14–0.16 in) long. The ovary has 5 to 7 locules and the style is 3.5–4.5 mm (0.14–0.18 in) long with a stigma 0.4–0.5 mm (0.016–0.020 in) wide. Flowering occurs from August to October, and the fruit is broadly conical, 3–4 mm (0.12–0.16 in) in diameter containing winged seeds.

== Taxonomy ==
This species was first described in 1919 by Edwin Cheel, who gave it the name Leptospermum mjoebergii in the Journal and Proceedings of the Royal Society of New South Wales from specimens collected near the Coleman River by Eric Mjöberg. In 1983, Joy Thompson transferred the species to Neofabricia as N. mjoebergii in the journal Telopea.

== Distribution and habitat ==
Neofabricia mjoebergii grows in open forest and woodland in central inland areas of Cape York Peninsula, south-west of Princess Charlotte Bay.
