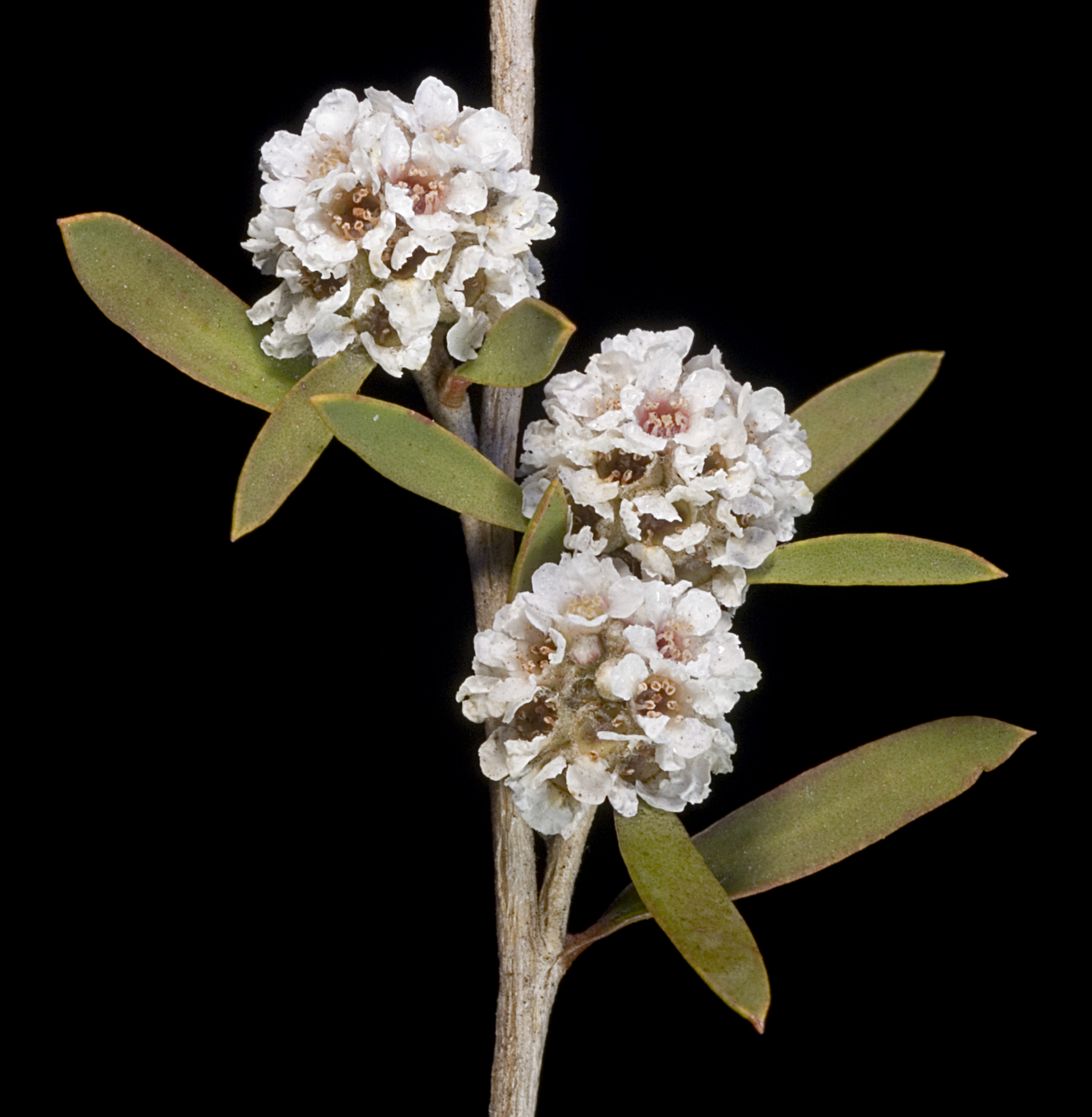

Conservation status
- Least Concern (IUCN 3.1)

Scientific classification
- Kingdom: Plantae
- Clade: Tracheophytes
- Clade: Angiosperms
- Clade: Eudicots
- Clade: Rosids
- Order: Myrtales
- Family: Myrtaceae
- Genus: Taxandria
- Species: T. linearifolia

Binomial name
- Taxandria linearifolia (DC.) J.R.Wheeler & N.G.Marchant

Synonyms
- Agonis linearifolia (DC.) Sweet; Billotia linearifolia (DC.) R.Br.; Leptospermum linearifolium DC.

= Taxandria linearifolia =

Species of tree

Taxandria linearifolia, also known as the swamp peppermint or the coarse teatree, is a small tree or shrub species that grows along south west coastal areas of Western Australia. This plant was previously classified as Agonis linearifolia but is now part of the Taxandria genus.

== Description ==
The shrub or small tree can grow up to a height of 5 metres (16 ft). It can flower between March and May or September to December producing white flowers.

== Distribution ==
Often found along the edge of swamps and watercourses in the Peel and South West regions of Western Australia where it grows in loam, clay or sand soils over quartzite or granite.

== Classification ==
First formally described as Leptospermum linearifolium by the botanist Augustin Pyramus de Candolle in 1828 as part of Prodromus Systematis Naturalis Regni Vegetabilis. It was later placed into the Agonis genera by R.Sweet in Sweet in 1830) in Hortus Britannicus. The plant was subsequently reclassified to T. linearifolia in a 2007 revision by Wheeler and Marchant into the new genus Taxandria.
