= Neofabricia sericisepala =

Conservation status
- Least Concern (IUCN 3.1)

Scientific classification
- Kingdom: Plantae
- Clade: Tracheophytes
- Clade: Angiosperms
- Clade: Eudicots
- Clade: Rosids
- Order: Myrtales
- Family: Myrtaceae
- Tribe: Leptospermeae
- Genus: Neofabricia
- Species: N. sericisepala

Binomial name
- Neofabricia sericisepala J.R.Clarkson & Joy Thomps.

Genus of shrubs

Neofabricia sericisepala is a species of flowering plant in the family Myrtaceae, and is endemic to Cape York Peninsula in Queensland. It is a shrub or small tree with lance-shaped leaves with the narrower end towards the base, or narrowly elliptic, with yellow flowers borne singly in leaf axils, and broadly cup-shaped fruits.

== Description ==
Neofabricia sericisepala is a shrub or small tree that typically grows to a height of up to 6 m (20 ft) and has hard, grey bark. The leaves are sessile, lance-shaped with the narrower end towards the base, sometimes narrowly elliptic, mostly 20–30 mm (0.79–1.18 in) long, 2–4 mm (0.079–0.157 in) wide. The flowers are usually borne singly in leaf axils, with brown Bracts and bracteoles that fall off as the flower develops. The floral tube is funnel-shaped, 2.5–3.0 mm (0.098–0.118 in) long and 4.0–4.5 mm (0.16–0.18 in) wide and densely covered with silky hairs. The sepals are more or less round, 3.0–3.5 mm (0.12–0.14 in) in diameter and densely covered with silky hairs. The petals are yellow, more or less round, 5.0–5.5 mm (0.20–0.22 in) long. The ovary has 5 to 8 locules and the style is 2.5–3.0 mm (0.098–0.118 in) long with a stigma 0.5 mm (0.020 in) wide. Flowering mostly occurs from May to July, and the fruit is broadly cup-shaped, 5–6 mm (0.20–0.24 in) in diameter containing winged seeds.

== Distribution and habitat ==
Neofabricia sericisepala grows in woodland in central and southern areas of Cape York Peninsula.

== Taxonomy ==
Neofabricia sericisepala was first formally described in 1989 by John Richard Clarkson and Joy Thompson in the journal Telopea from a specimen collected by Clarkson near Merapah Station in 1987.
