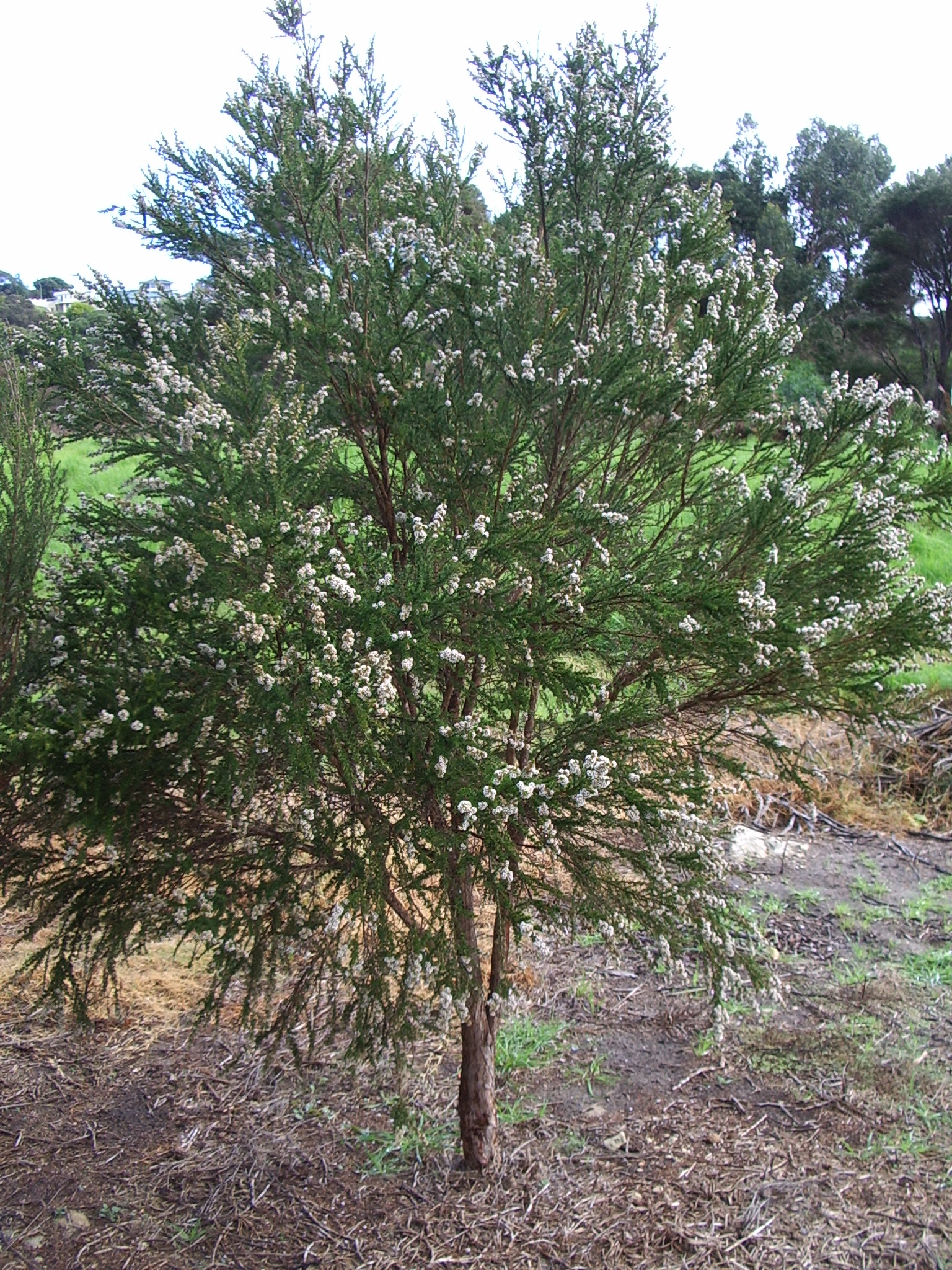

Conservation status
- Least Concern (IUCN 3.1)

Scientific classification
- Kingdom: Plantae
- Clade: Tracheophytes
- Clade: Angiosperms
- Clade: Eudicots
- Clade: Rosids
- Order: Myrtales
- Family: Myrtaceae
- Genus: Taxandria
- Species: T. juniperina

Binomial name
- Taxandria juniperina (Schauer) J.R.Wheeler & N.G.Marchant

Synonyms
- Agonis juniperina Schauer

= Taxandria juniperina =

Species of tree

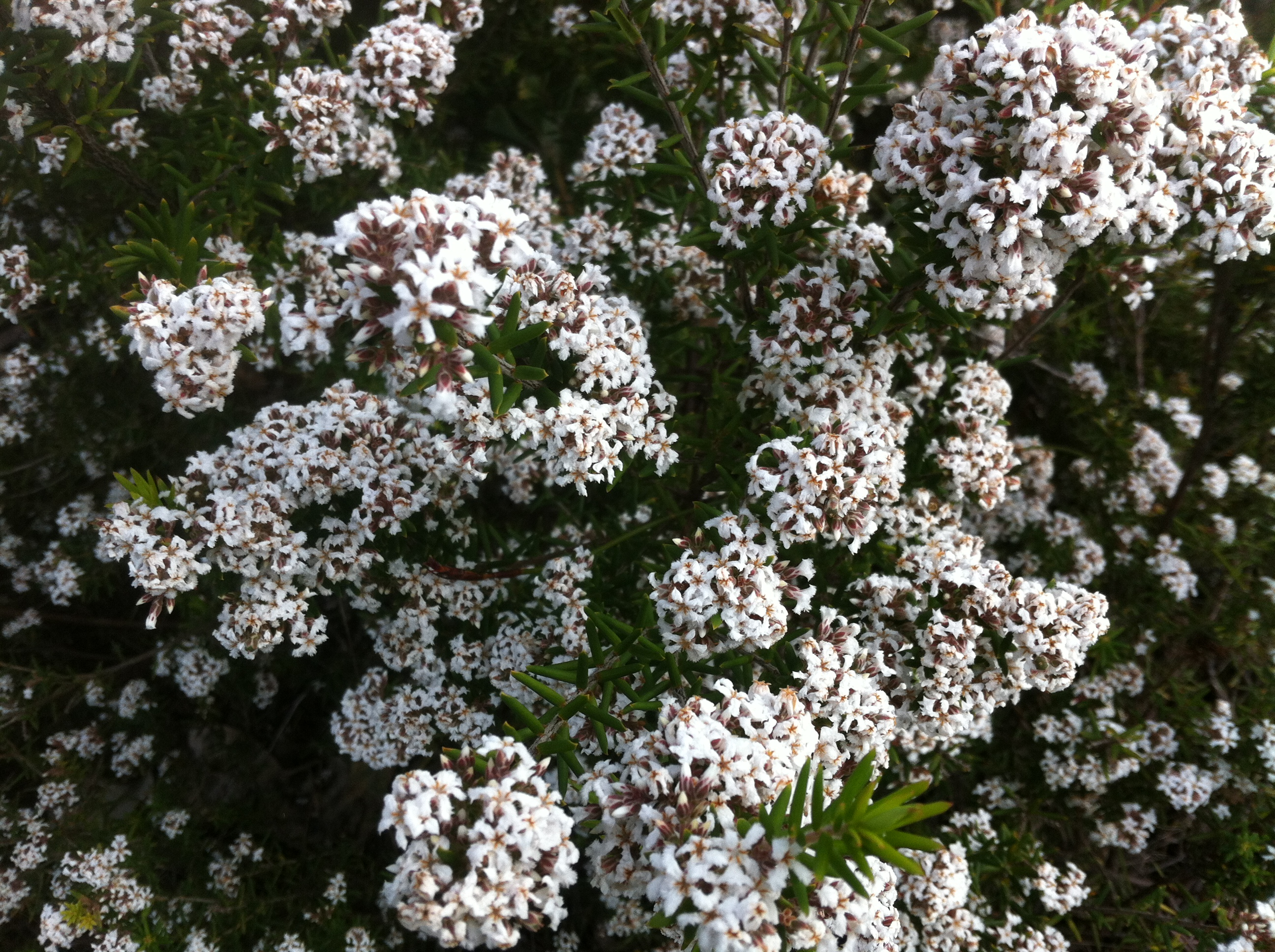
Taxandria juniperina flowers

Taxandria juniperina commonly known as wattie, native cedar, Warren River cedar or juniper myrtle is a species of flowering plant in the family Myrtaceae. It is a shrub or tree endemic to the south west corner of Western Australia. This plant was previously classified as Agonis juniperina but is now part of the genus Taxandria. The Noongar peoples know the tree as watti.

== Description ==
Taxandria juniperina occurs mostly as an erect tree or shrub that usually grows to less than 10 metres (33 ft) as a dense shrub but can grow up to 27 metres (89 ft) in its native environment. It has fibrous brown bark that is a light red colour on the underside. It grows as a dense shrub in space or as a tall erect tree when part of a thicket. When the leaves and young stems are bruised they release a spicy perfume from which the plant is recognised to be a member of the family Myrtaceae. It is closely related to Leptospermum (Tea Tree). The tree has evergreen foliage with very narrow leaves, usually 7–13mm long and 0.3–1.5 mm wide. The flowers produced by T. juniperina occur between February and November and are described as upright whitish spikes. Each flower is white with some pink, 5 mm in diameter. The species is distinguished from other members of the genera by its tree habit and the leaves which are typically 7 to 13 millimetres (0.28 to 0.51 in) length and usually flat to very slightly concave above and convex below. It also has glabrous sepals.

== Distribution and habitat ==
Taxandria juniperina occurs in a coastal strip in the south west corner of western Australia from Busselton south to Augusta to Waychinicup just east of Albany. The tree prefers margins of winter-wet or permanent swamps or watercourses, but grows in a range of soil types from loam and peat to sand and gravel.

== Classification ==
First formally described by the botanist Johannes Conrad Schauer in 1844 as part of Johann Georg Christian Lehmann's work Plantae Preissianae. The plant was subsequently reclassified to Taxandria juniperina in a 2007 revision by Wheeler and Marchant into the new genus Taxandria.
