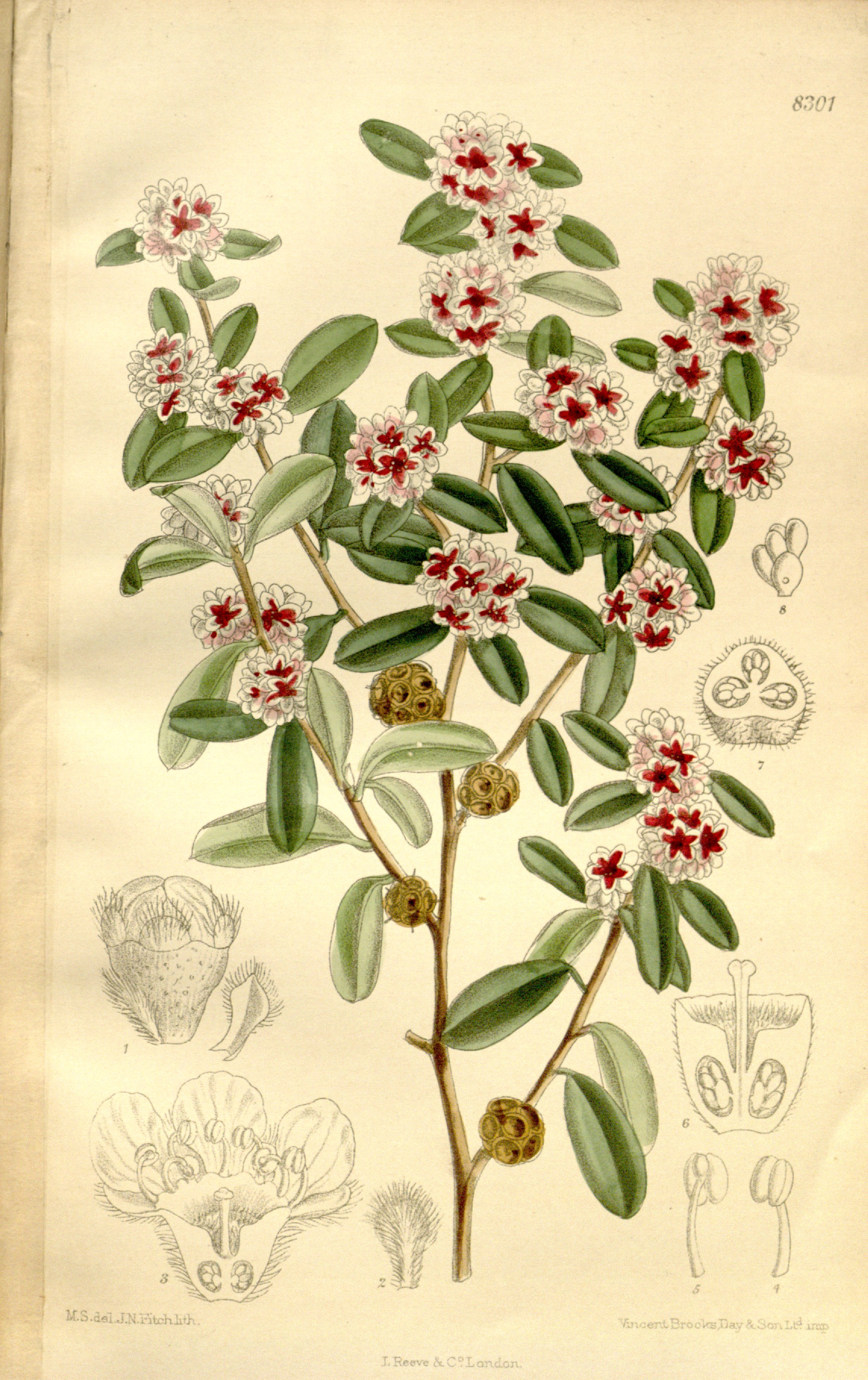
- Illustration of Taxandria marginata Curtis's Botanical Magazine, London, 1910

Scientific classification
- Kingdom: Plantae
- Clade: Tracheophytes
- Clade: Angiosperms
- Clade: Eudicots
- Clade: Rosids
- Order: Myrtales
- Family: Myrtaceae
- Genus: Taxandria
- Species: T. marginata

Binomial name
- Taxandria marginata (Labill.) J.R.Wheeler & N.G.Marchant

= Taxandria marginata =

Species of tree

Taxandria marginata is a species of shrub that grows in the south west corner of Western Australia. This plant was previously classified as Agonis marginata but was reclassified by Wheeler and Marchant into the new genus Taxandria in a 2007 revision.

The shrub typically grows to a height of 2 to 3 metres (7 to 10 ft). It produces white flowers between February and August.

It grows around granite boulders and among rocky outcrops in coastal areas in skeletal sandy, loamy or clay soils. The species is found along the south coast of Western Australia in the Great Southern and Goldfields-Esperance regions.
