= Taxandria floribunda =

Scientific classification
- Kingdom: Plantae
- Clade: Tracheophytes
- Clade: Angiosperms
- Clade: Eudicots
- Clade: Rosids
- Order: Myrtales
- Family: Myrtaceae
- Genus: Taxandria
- Species: T. floribunda

Binomial name
- Taxandria floribunda (Turcz.) J.R.Wheeler & N.G.Marchant

Synonyms
- Agonis floribunda

Species of tree

Taxandria floribunda is a small tree or shrub species that is endemic to an area in southern Western Australia. This plant was previously classified as Agonis floribunda but is now part of the Taxandria genus.

Te erect shrub usually has a single stem and can grow to a height of 2 metres (7 ft). It blooms from October to December producing white-pink flowers.

The species is distinguished from other members of the genera by the flower clusters surrounded by conspicuous and persistent involucral bracts that also surround the fruits.

It is found on both the upper and lower parts of ranges, in wet depressions, swamps and stony areas in the northern part, in the Stirling Range and around Cranbrook, of the Great Southern region of Western Australia where it grows in sandy, clay or peat soils over quartzite.

First formally described as Agonis floribunda by the botanist Nikolai Turczaninow in 1849 as part of the work Decas sexta generum plantarum hucusque, non descriptorum in Bulletin de la Société Impériale des Naturalistes de Moscou. The plant was subsequently reclassified to T. linearifolia in a 2007 revision by Wheeler and Marchant into the new genus Taxandria.
