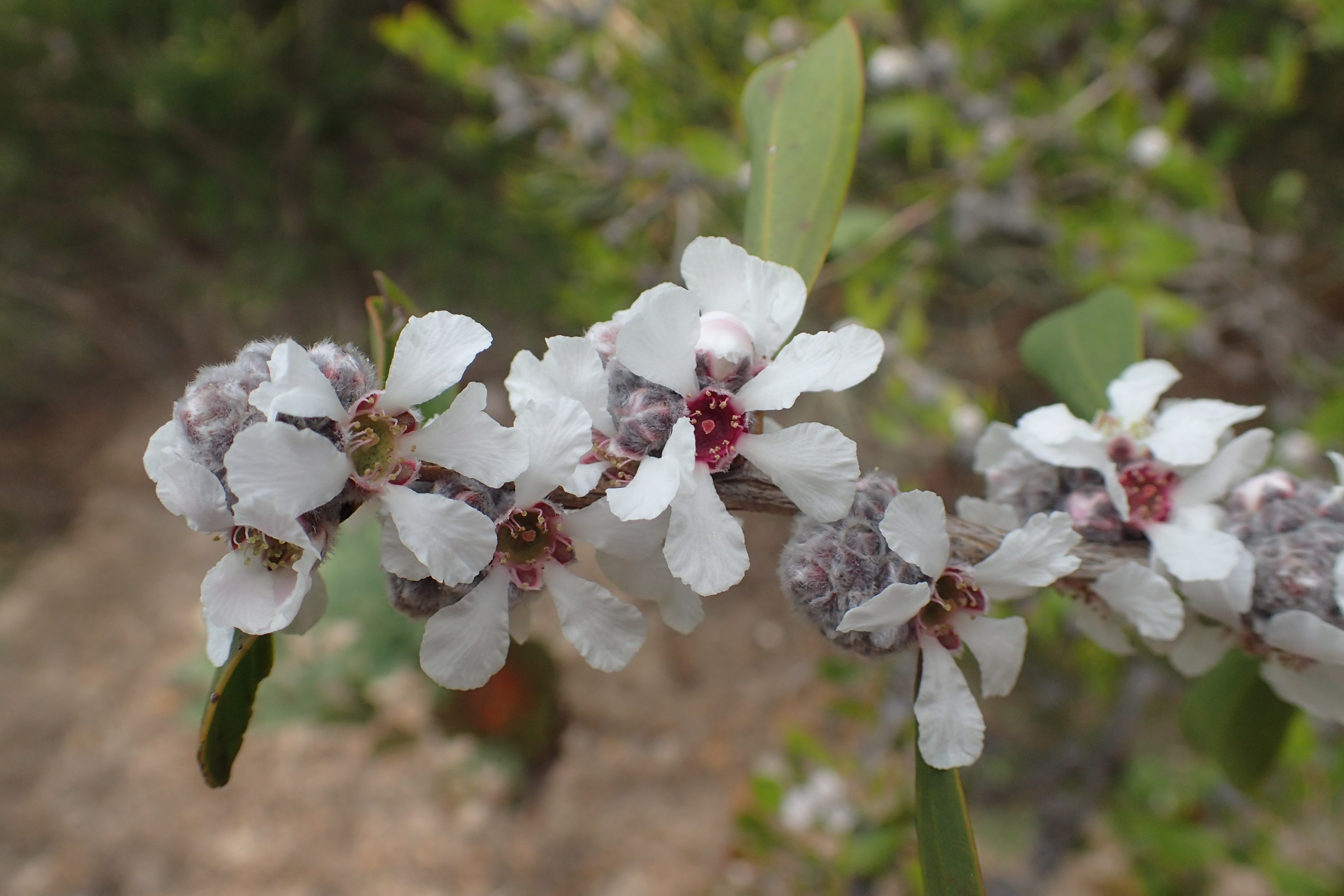

Scientific classification
- Kingdom: Plantae
- Clade: Tracheophytes
- Clade: Angiosperms
- Clade: Eudicots
- Clade: Rosids
- Order: Myrtales
- Family: Myrtaceae
- Genus: Agonis
- Species: A. baxteri

Binomial name
- Agonis baxteri (Benth.) J.R.Wheeler & N.G.Marchant

Synonyms
- Agonis obtusissima F.Muell.; Melaleuca baxteri Benth.; Myrtoleucodendron baxteri (Benth.) Kuntze

= Agonis baxteri =

Species of flowering plant

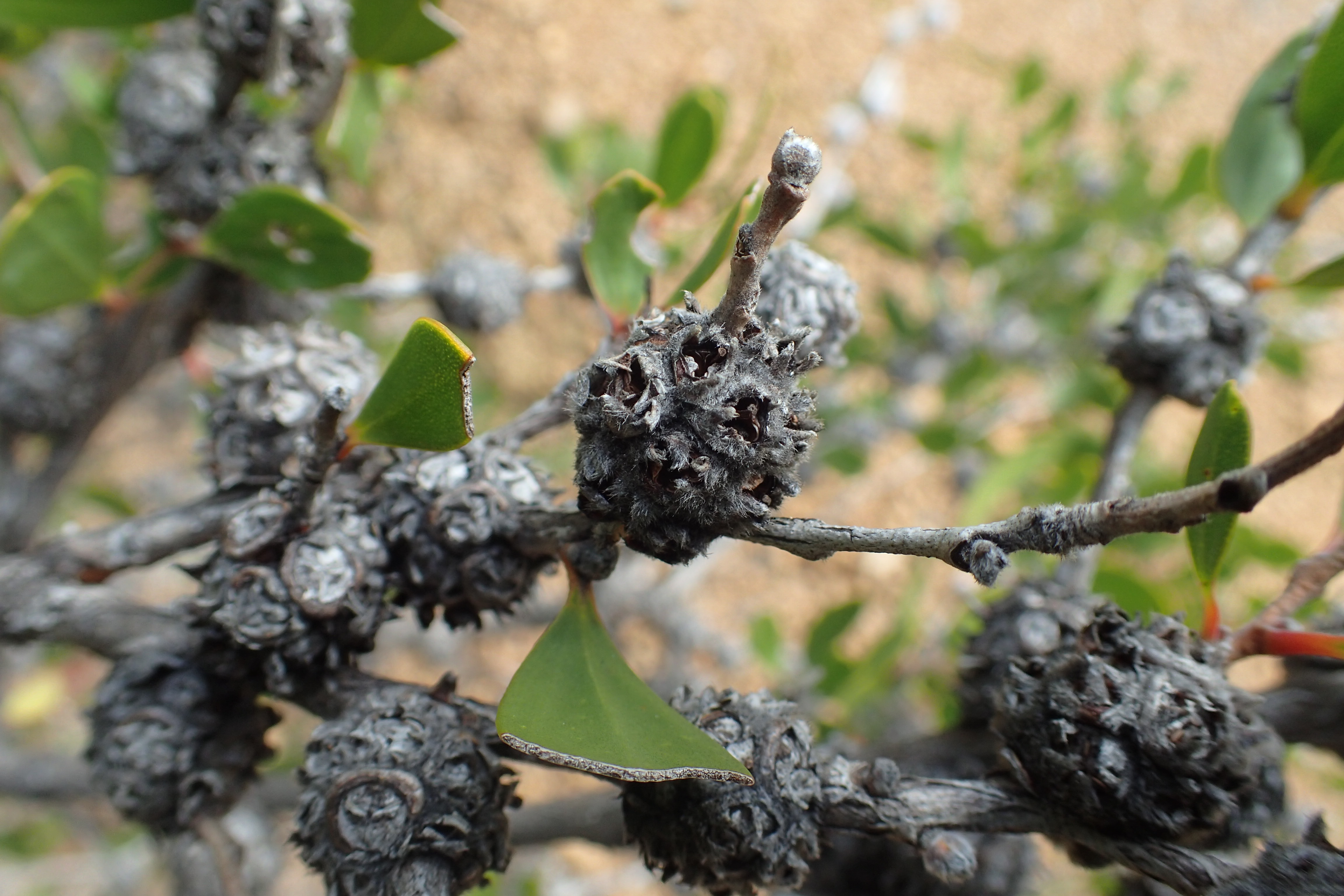
Fruit

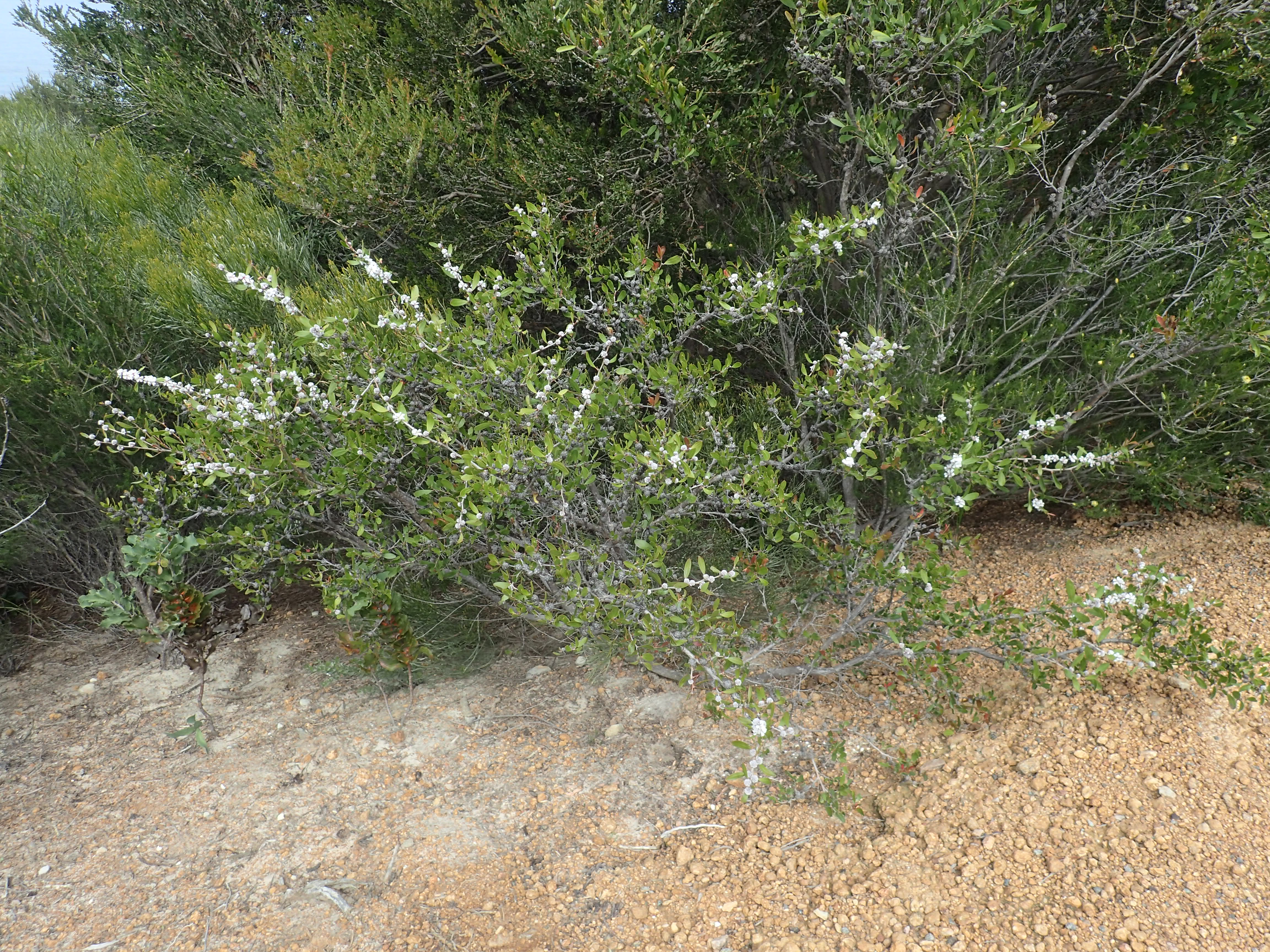
Habit in the Fitzgerald River National Park

Agonis baxteri is a species of flowering plant in the family Myrtaceae and is endemic to the southwest of Western Australia. It is an erect, sometimes bushy shrub with elliptic to egg-shaped leaves with the narrower end towards the base, and usually white flowers with 23 to 32 stamens.

== Description ==
Agonis baxteri is an upright, often spindly shrub that typically grows to a height of up to 2 m (6 ft 7 in), its branchlets usually glabrous. Its leaves are dark green, elliptic to egg-shaped or narrowly so, with the narrower end towards the base, mostly 25–55 mm (0.98–2.17 in) long and 7–20 mm (0.28–0.79 in) wide, usually with three longitudinal veins. The flowers are arranged in clusters 15–25 mm (0.59–0.98 in) in diameter with hairy, grey, more or less round bracts 2.5–3.5 mm (0.098–0.138 in) long and similar bracteoles. The flowers are usually white, 12–14 mm (0.47–0.55 in) in diameter with sepals 1.8–2.5 mm (0.071–0.098 in) long, the petals 5–9 mm (0.20–0.35 in) long, and usually 23 to 32 stamens mostly 1–2 mm (0.039–0.079 in) long. Flowering mainly occurs from October to December and the fruits are in clusters 10–15 mm (0.39–0.59 in) wide. The species is superficially similar to Taxandria marginata.

== Taxonomy ==
In 1867, George Bentham described Melaleuca baxteri in Flora Australiensis from specimens collected by William Baxter at "King George's Sound or to the eastward". In 2007, Judy Wheeler and Neville Marchant changed the name to Agonis baxteri in the journal Nuytsia. The specific epithet (baxteri) honours the collector of the type specimens.

== Distribution and habitat ==
Agonis baxteri is found on sandplains, dunes, swamps, stony hills, disturbed and disturbed areas along the south coast in the Goldfields-Esperance region of Western Australia in the Esperance Plains and Mallee IBRA bioregions where it grows in sand and loam over quartzite, limestone or granite.

== Conservation status ==
This species is classified as "not threatened" by the Western Australian Government Department of Biodiversity, Conservation and Attractions.
