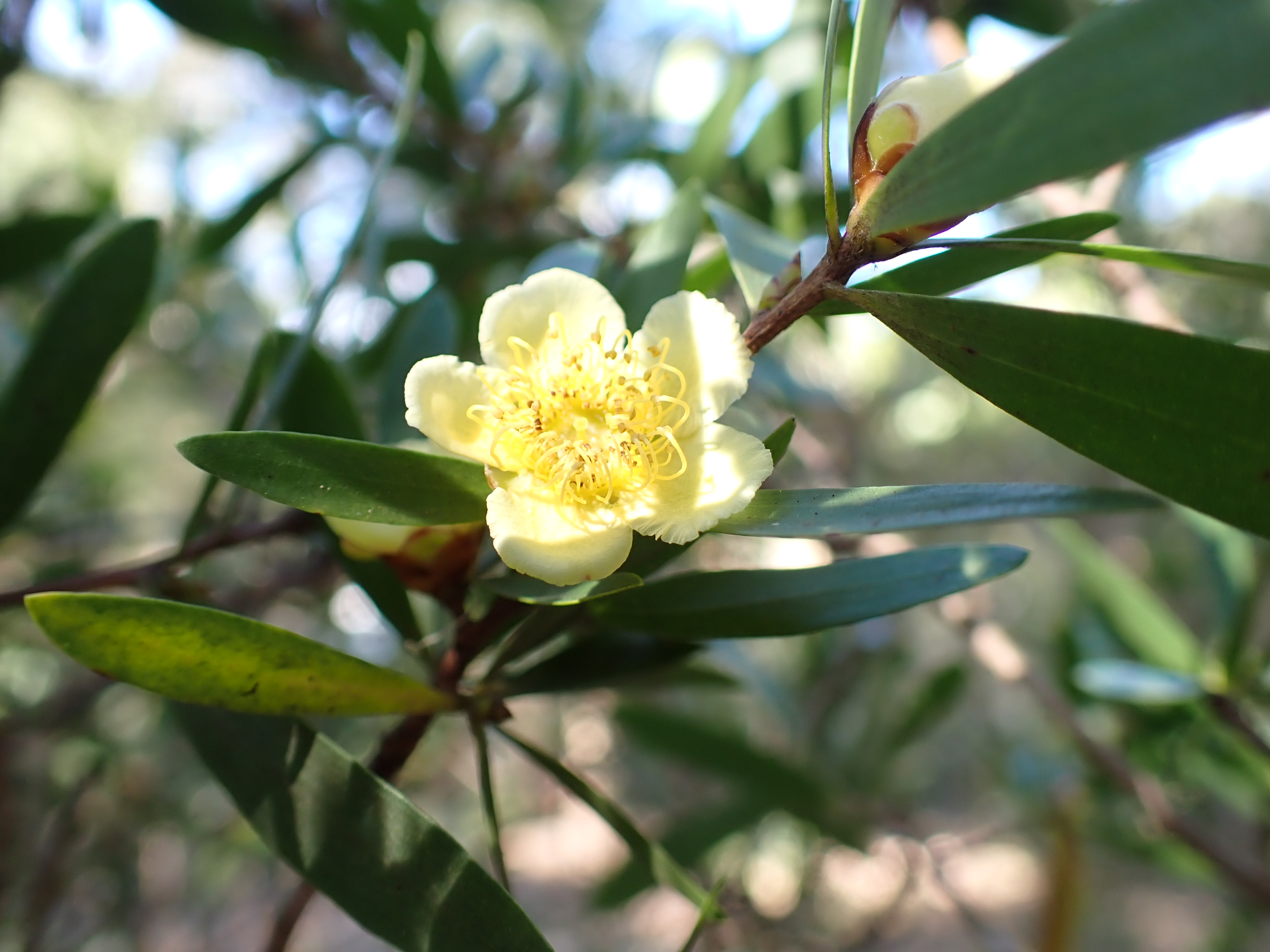
- Neofabricia myrtifolia in Mount Coot-tha Botanic Gardens

Scientific classification
- Kingdom: Plantae
- Clade: Tracheophytes
- Clade: Angiosperms
- Clade: Eudicots
- Clade: Rosids
- Order: Myrtales
- Family: Myrtaceae
- Subfamily: Myrtoideae
- Tribe: Leptospermeae
- Genus: Neofabricia; Joy Thomps.

Synonyms
- Fabricia Gaertn. nom. illeg., nom. superfl.; Leptospermum sect. Fabricia Benth. & Hook.f.

= Neofabricia =

Genus of shrubs

Neofabricia is a genus of 3 species of flowering plants in the family Myrtaceae, endemic to Queensland. Plants in the genus Neofabricia are shrubs or small trees with yellow or white flowers arranged singly in leaf axils with many stamens, an ovary with usually 5 to 10 locules, and the fruit a woody capsule.

== Description ==
Plants in the genus Neofabricia are shrubs or small trees with yellow or white flowers arranged singly in leaf axils. The flowers have many stamens with thin filaments, the anthers not swinging freely on the filaments. The ovary usually has 5 to 10, sometimes up to 15 locules, each with ovules in 2 rows. The fruit is a more or less woody capsule containing one or a few seeds.

== Taxonomy ==
The genus Neofabricia was first formally described in 1988 by Joy Thompson in the journal Telopea, and the type species was nominated as Neofabricia myrtifolia.

In 1788, Joseph Gaertner described Fabricia, but that name was illegitimate because it had already been used in 1763 by Michel Adanson (for a genus now known as Lavandula.)

The following is a list of Neofabricia species accepted by the Australian Plant Census as at July 2024:

- Neofabricia mjoebergii (Cheel) Joy Thomps.
- Neofabricia myrtifolia (Gaertn.) Joy Thomps.
- Neofabricia sericisepala J.R.Clarkson & Joy Thomps.
