= Taxandria callistachys =

Scientific classification
- Kingdom: Plantae
- Clade: Tracheophytes
- Clade: Angiosperms
- Clade: Eudicots
- Clade: Rosids
- Order: Myrtales
- Family: Myrtaceae
- Genus: Taxandria
- Species: T. callistachys

Binomial name
- Taxandria callistachys J.R.Wheeler & N.G.Marchant

Species of tree

Taxandria callistachys is a shrub species that is endemic to an area in southern Western Australia.

The erect shrub grows to a maximum height of approximately 2.5 metres (8 ft). It blooms from March to September producing white flowers.

It was first formally described by the botanists, John Wheeler and Neville Marchant in 2007, as part of the work A revision of the Western Australian genus Agonis (Myrtaceae) and two new segregate genera Taxandria and Paragonis in the journal Nuytsia.

Often found along ridges, in swamps and winter wet areas and along road verges in the along the south coast of the Goldfields-Esperance region of Western Australia where it grows in clay, sand or loam soils around laterite or granite.
