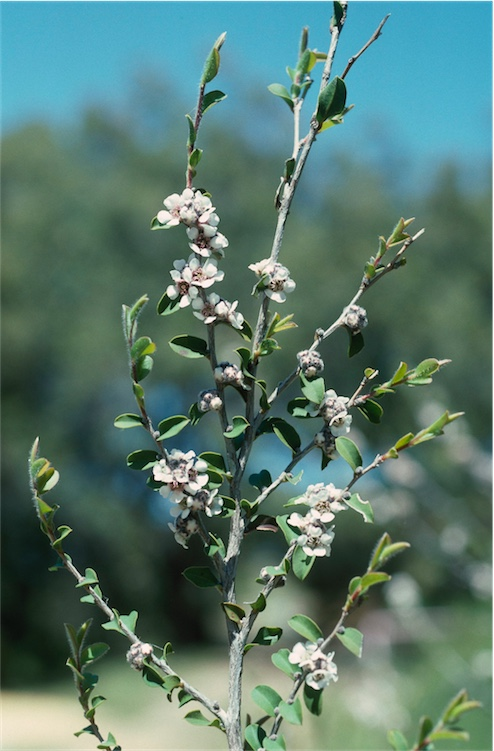
- In Kings Park

Scientific classification
- Kingdom: Plantae
- Clade: Tracheophytes
- Clade: Angiosperms
- Clade: Eudicots
- Clade: Rosids
- Order: Myrtales
- Family: Myrtaceae
- Genus: Agonis
- Species: A. theiformis

Binomial name
- Agonis theiformis Schauer

= Agonis theiformis =

Species of flowering plant

Agonis theiformis is a species of flowering plant in the family Myrtaceae and is endemic to the southwest of Western Australia. It is a shrub with elliptic to egg-shaped, sometimes broadly egg-shaped leaves, and clusters of white flowers with mostly 15 to 20 stamens opposite the sepals, the fruit a spherical cluster of cup-shaped capsules.

== Description ==
Agonis theiformis is an often spindly shrub that typically grows to a height of up to 2–3 m (6 ft 7 in – 9 ft 10 in), its branchlets sometimes zig-zagged and hairy at first, later glabrous. Its leaves are sessile, elliptic to egg-shaped or broadly so, wavy and twisted, 6–20 mm (0.24–0.79 in) long, 4–10 mm (0.16–0.39 in) wide, with a short point on the tip. The upper surface of the leaves is more or less glabrous and the lower surface has a prominent mid-vein and a few soft hairs. The flowers are arranged in clusters 7–11 mm (0.28–0.43 in) in diameter with broadly to very broadly egg-shaped bracts 1.3–2.0 mm (0.051–0.079 in) long and densely hairy, and similar bracteoles. The sepals are egg-shaped, 1.0–1.5 mm (0.039–0.059 in) long, the petals white and 2.5–4 mm (0.098–0.157 in) long. There are 15 to 20 stamens with 3 or 4 opposite each sepal, none opposite the petals, 0.7–1.5 mm (0.028–0.059 in) long. Flowering mainly occurs from October to December and the fruits are in clusters 6–8 mm (0.24–0.31 in) wide, the individual capsules cup-shaped to broadly top-shaped, 3.5–4.0 mm (0.14–0.16 in) wide.

== Taxonomy ==
Agonis theiformis was first formally described by Johannes Conrad Schauer in Lehmann's Plantae Preissianae. The specific epithet (theiformis) means 'Thea-shaped'.

== Distribution and habitat ==
This species of Agonis grows in heath, shrubland and forest on a range of soil types from Northcliffe to Cape Riche and inland to the Stirling Range in the Avon Wheatbelt, Esperance Plains, Jarrah Forest and Warren bioregions of southern Western Australia.
