= Homalospermum =

Conservation status
- Least Concern (IUCN 3.1)

Scientific classification
- Kingdom: Plantae
- Clade: Tracheophytes
- Clade: Angiosperms
- Clade: Eudicots
- Clade: Rosids
- Order: Myrtales
- Family: Myrtaceae
- Subfamily: Myrtoideae
- Tribe: Leptospermeae
- Genus: Homalospermum; S.Schauer
- Species: H. firmum

Binomial name
- Homalospermum firmum S.Schauer

Synonyms
- Leptospermum firmum (S.Schauer) Benth.

Genus of flowering plants

Homalospermum is a genus of flowering plants in the myrtle family first described as a genus in 1843. It contains only one known species, Homalospermum firmum, a shrub endemic to southwestern Western Australia.

The genus and species were first described by Sebastian Schauer in 1843.
