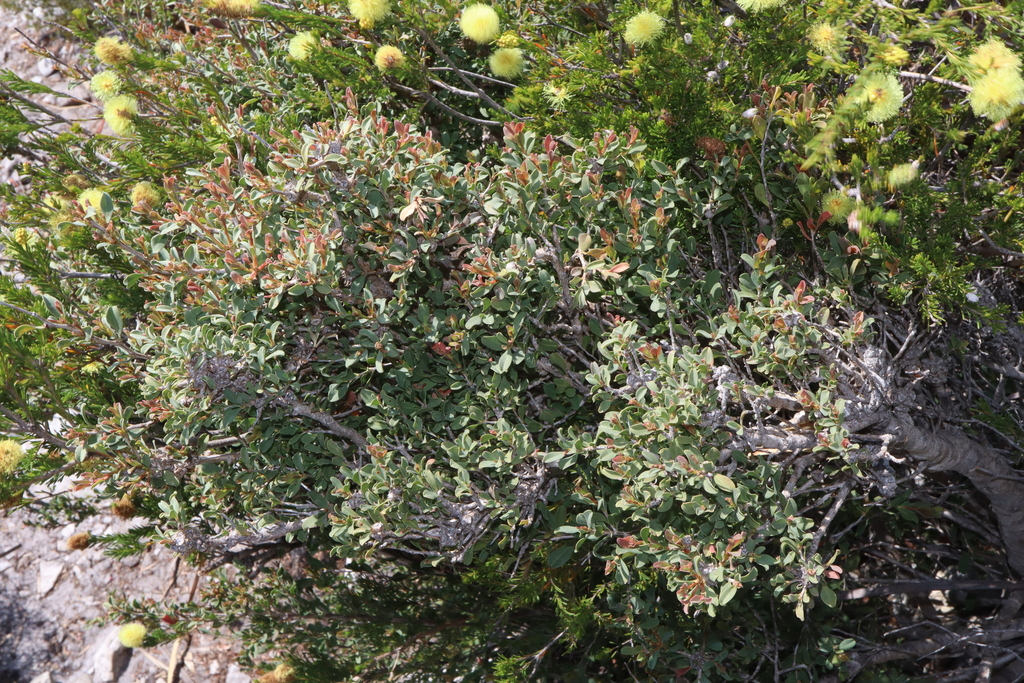
- In the Fitzgerald River National Park

Scientific classification
- Kingdom: Plantae
- Clade: Tracheophytes
- Clade: Angiosperms
- Clade: Eudicots
- Clade: Rosids
- Order: Myrtales
- Family: Myrtaceae
- Genus: Agonis
- Species: A. undulata

Binomial name
- Agonis undulata Benth.

= Agonis undulata =

Species of flowering plant

Agonis undulata is a species of flowering plant in the family Myrtaceae, and is endemic to the Fitzgerald River National Park in the south of Western Australia. It is an erect shrub with more or less sessile, egg-shaped leaves with the narrower end towards the base, white flowers, and broadly cup-shaped capsules.

== Description ==
Agonis undulata is an erect shrub that typically grows to a height of up to 2 m (6 ft 7 in), mature plants with thick, gnarled branches. Its branchlets are almost glabrous. The leaves are more or less sessile, egg-shaped with the narrower end towards the base, 9–20 mm (0.35–0.79 in) long and 4–10 mm (0.16–0.39 in) wide and more or less wavy. The flowers are arranged in clusters 7–10 mm (0.28–0.39 in) wide with egg-shaped bracts, and bracteoles 2.5–3.0 mm (0.098–0.118 in) long. The floral tube is 1.7–2 mm (0.067–0.079 in) long, the sepals triangular and 2.0–2.5 mm (0.079–0.098 in) long. The petals are white, 2.0–2.5 mm (0.079–0.098 in) long and tapered and there are 15 to 20 stamens with filaments 0.5–1 mm (0.020–0.039 in) long, 3 or 4 opposite the sepals and none opposite the petals. Flowering has been recorded in September and March, and the fruit is a hairy, broadly cup-shaped to top-shaped capsule 4–5 mm (0.16–0.20 in) in diameter.

== Taxonomy ==
Agonis undulata was first formally described in 1867 by George Bentham in his Flora Australiensis from specimens collected by James Drummond. The specific epithet (undulata) means 'wavy'.

== Distribution and habitat ==
This species of Agonis grows in shrubland or heath and has only been recorded in the Fitzgerald River National Park near the coast of southern Western Australia.
