= Taxandria fragrans =

Scientific classification
- Kingdom: Plantae
- Clade: Embryophytes
- Clade: Tracheophytes
- Clade: Spermatophytes
- Clade: Angiosperms
- Clade: Eudicots
- Clade: Rosids
- Order: Myrtales
- Family: Myrtaceae
- Genus: Taxandria
- Species: T. fragrans

Binomial name
- Taxandria fragrans (J.R.Wheeler & N.G.Marchant) J.R.Wheeler & N.G.Marchant

Species of tree

Taxandria fragrans is a shrub species that is endemic to an area in south western Western Australia.

The shrub grows to a maximum height of approximately 2 metres (7 ft). It blooms from February to May producing white flowers. It is often found in wet areas such as swamps, rivers and valleys in coastal areas along the South West region of Western Australia where it grows in peaty sandy or loamy soils over laterite.

It was first formally described by the botanists, John Wheeler and Neville Marchant in 2007, as part of the work A revision of the Western Australian genus Agonis (Myrtaceae) and two new segregate genera Taxandria and Paragonis in the journal Nuytsia.
