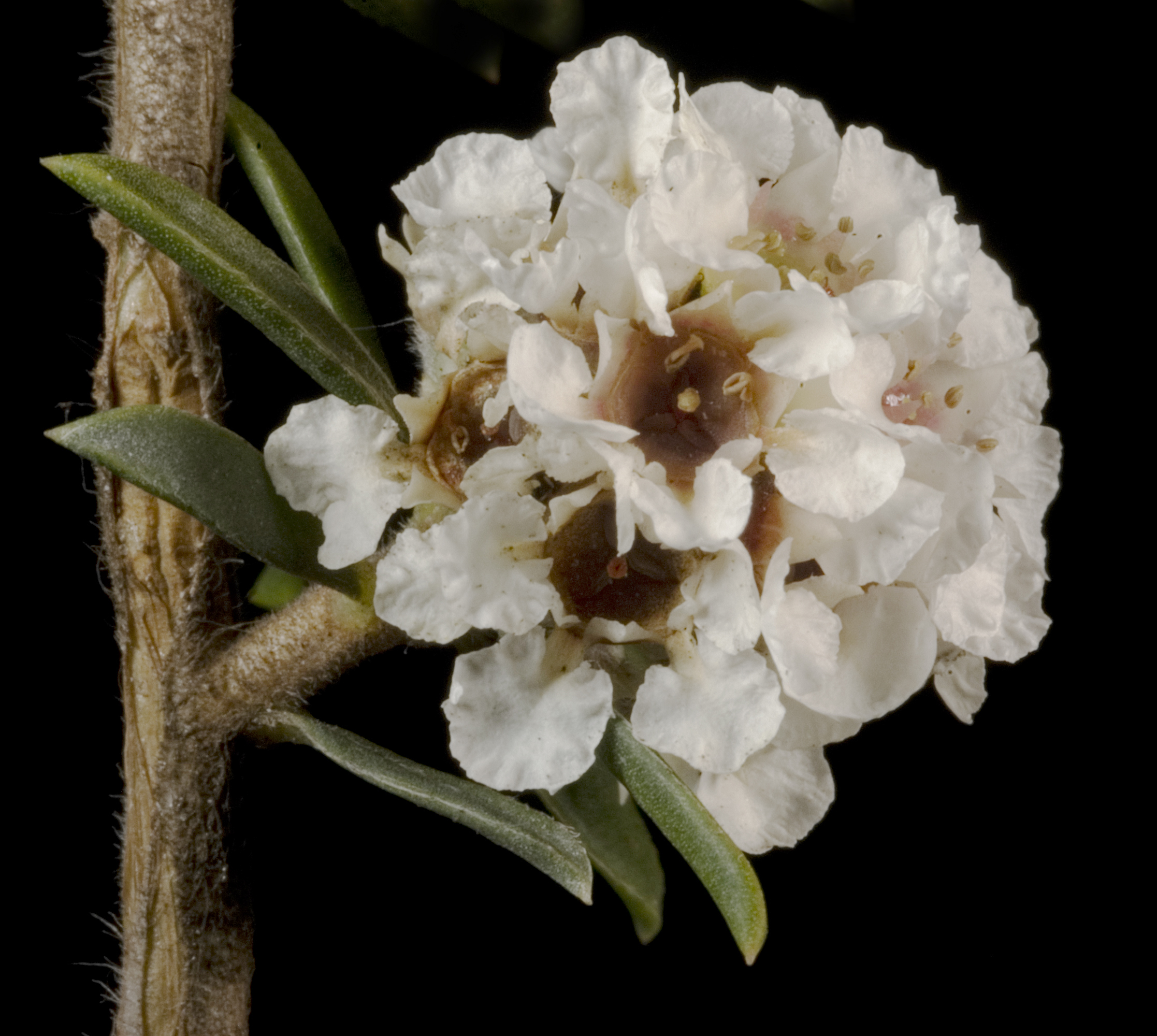

Scientific classification
- Kingdom: Plantae
- Clade: Tracheophytes
- Clade: Angiosperms
- Clade: Eudicots
- Clade: Rosids
- Order: Myrtales
- Family: Myrtaceae
- Genus: Taxandria
- Species: T. inundata

Binomial name
- Taxandria inundata J.R.Wheeler & N.G.Marchant

= Taxandria inundata =

Species of tree

Taxandria inundata is a species of shrub in the Myrtaceae family that is endemic to an area along the south western coast of Western Australia.

The shrub can grow to a height of approximately 2 metres (7 ft). It blooms from January to June producing white flowers. Found in water-logged low-lying areas, swamps and lake margins in the South West region of Western Australia where it grows in peaty sandy or clay soils.

It was first formally described by the botanists, John Wheeler and Neville Marchant in 2007, as part of the work A revision of the Western Australian genus Agonis (Myrtaceae) and two new segregate genera Taxandria and Paragonis in the journal Nuytsia.
