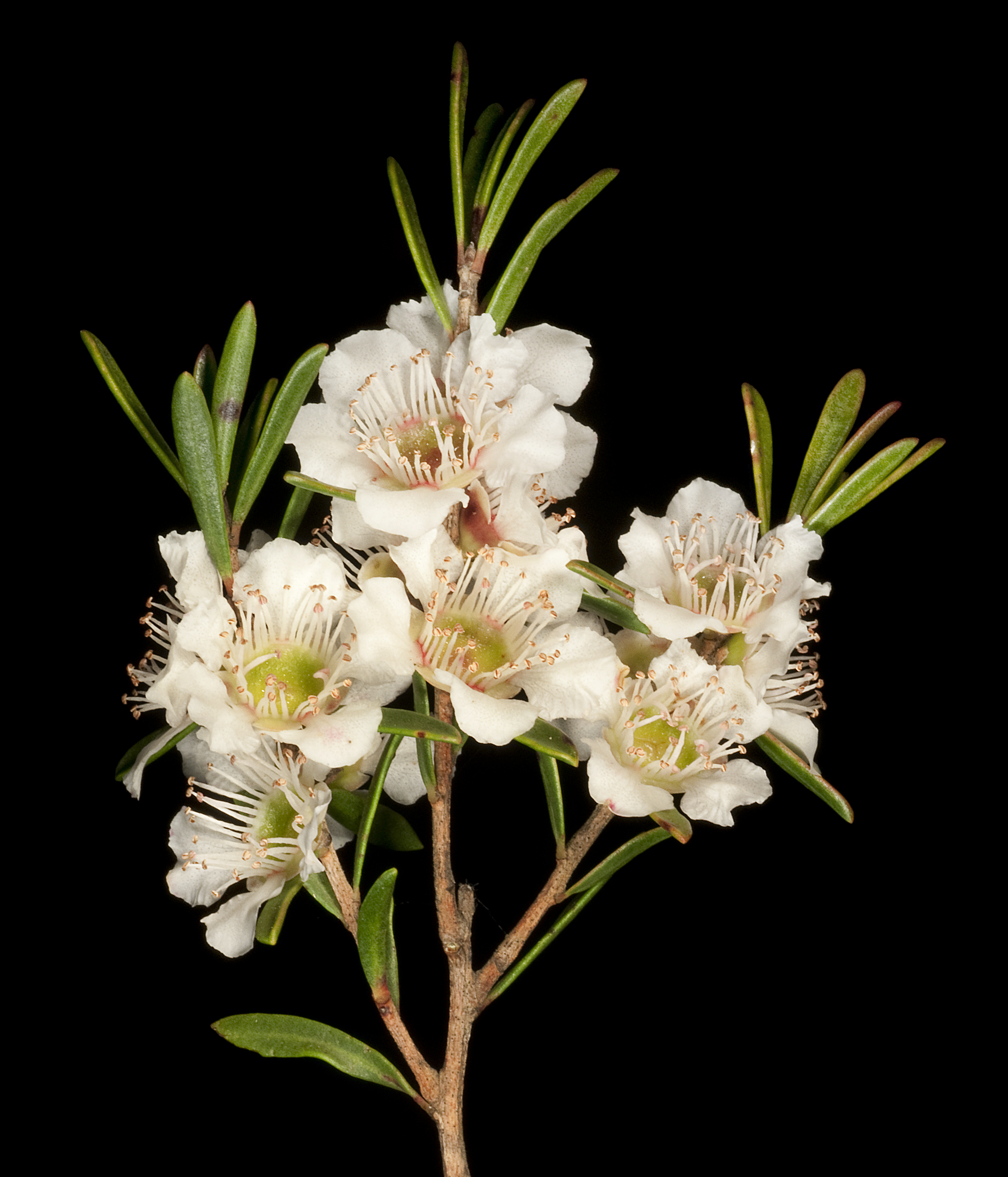
- Flowering stem

Scientific classification
- Kingdom: Plantae
- Clade: Tracheophytes
- Clade: Angiosperms
- Clade: Eudicots
- Clade: Rosids
- Order: Myrtales
- Family: Myrtaceae
- Genus: Agonis
- Species: A. grandiflora

Binomial name
- Agonis grandiflora Benth.

Synonyms
- Paragonis grandiflora (Benth.) J.R.Wheeler & N.G.Marchant

= Agonis grandiflora =

Genus of flowering plants

Agonis grandiflora is a species of flowering plant in the family Myrtaceae, and is endemic to the southwest of Western Australia. It is an erect, often straggly shrub with sessile, linear leaves, white flowers often suffused with pink and broadly cup-shaped capsules.

== Description ==
Agonis grandiflora is an erect, often straggly sbrub that typically grows to a height of 1.7 m (5 ft 7 in) and has many stems that are hairy at first, later glabrous. The leaves are sessile, linear, densely clustered, 5–20 mm (0.20–0.79 in) long and 0.5–1.2 mm (0.020–0.047 in) wide with a small point on the tip. The flowers are arranged singly or in groups of 2, 3 or 4 in upper leaf axils. There are bracts, and bracteoles 3.5–5.5 mm (0.14–0.22 in) long. The floral tube is 3–4 mm (0.12–0.16 in) long, the sepals broadly elliptic to broadly egg-shaped 2–3 mm (0.079–0.118 in) long. The petals are spatula-shaped, often suffused with pink, 6.5–8 mm (0.26–0.31 in) long and 12–17 mm (0.47–0.67 in) across. There are 22 to 35 stamens with filaments 2.5–4 mm (0.098–0.157 in) long. Flowering mainly occurs from September to November, and the fruit is a capsule 2.5–3.0 mm (0.098–0.118 in) long and 3.0–3.5 mm (0.12–0.14 in) wide.

== Taxonomy ==
Agonis grandiflora was first formally described in 1867 by George Bentham in his Flora Australiensis. In 2007, Judith R. Wheeler and Neville G. Marchant transferred the species to the genus Paragonis as P. grandiflora, and that name is accepted by the Western Australian Herbarium and the Australian Plant Census, but not accepted by Plants of the World Online.

== Distribution and habitat ==
This species grows in woodland and scrub in a few locations on the Darling Scarp in the Jarrah Forest and Swan Coastal Plain bioregions in the south-west of Western Australia.
