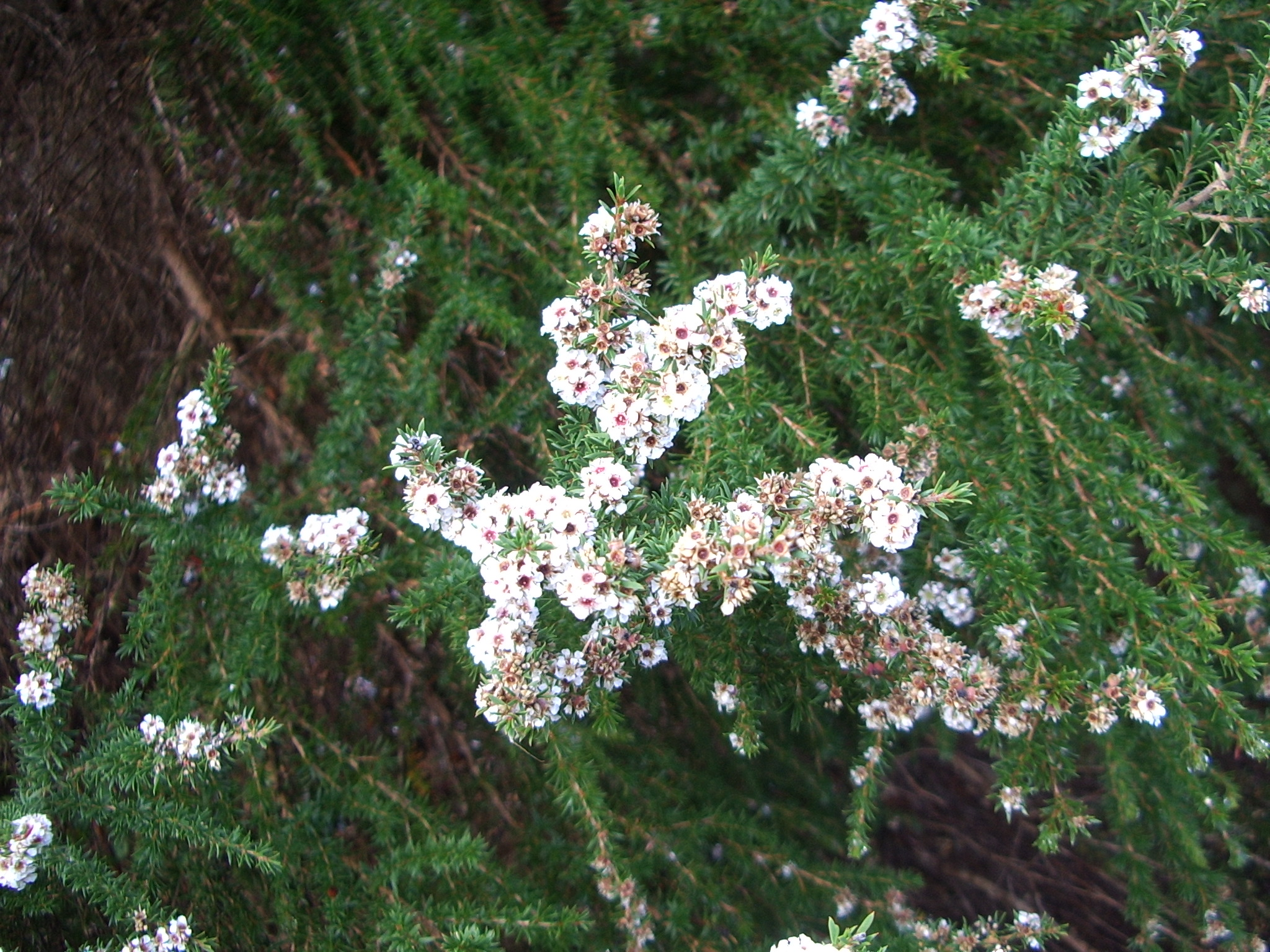
- Flowers of Taxandria juniperina
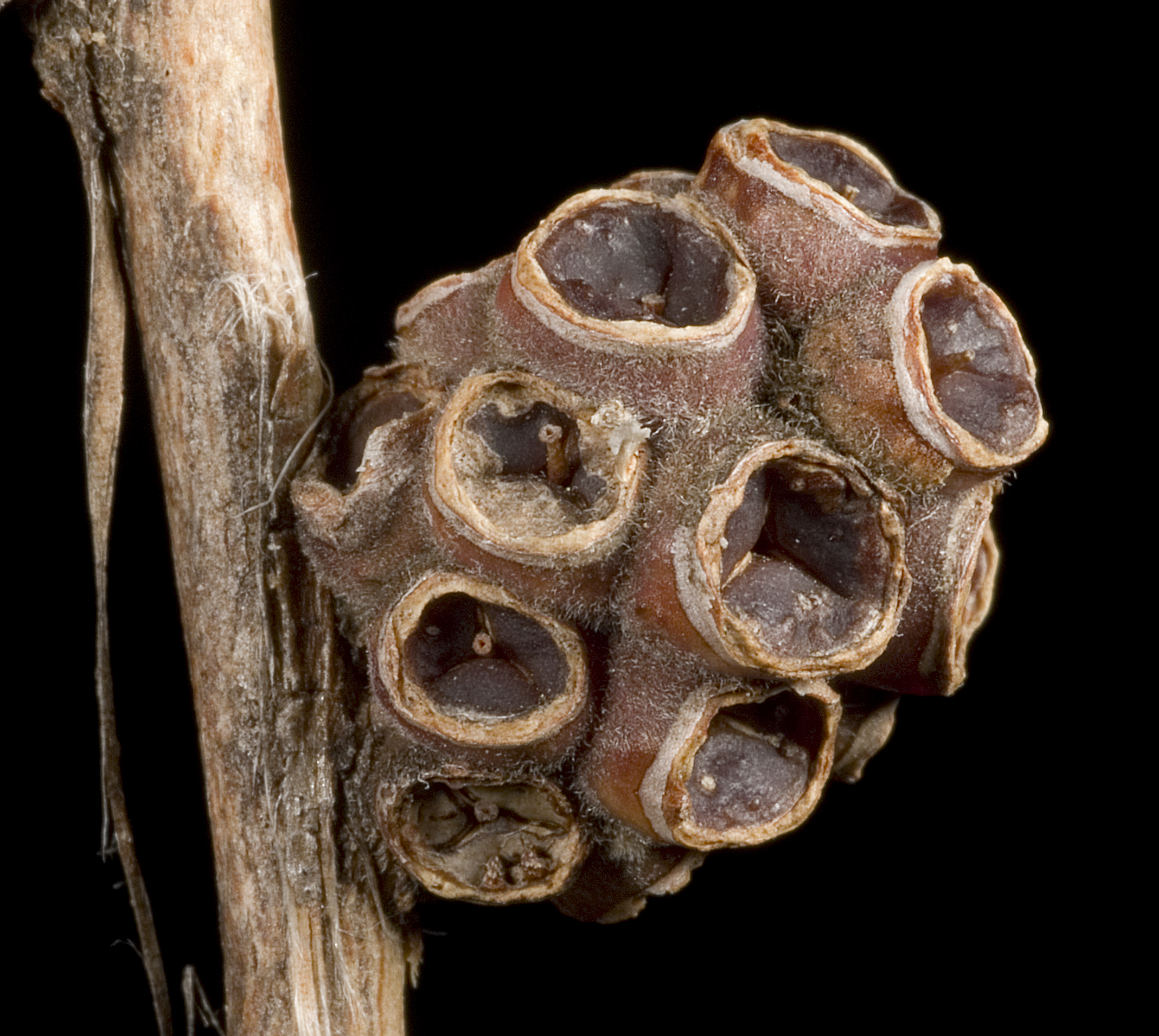

Scientific classification
- Kingdom: Plantae
- Clade: Tracheophytes
- Clade: Angiosperms
- Clade: Eudicots
- Clade: Rosids
- Order: Myrtales
- Family: Myrtaceae
- Tribe: Leptospermeae
- Genus: Taxandria (Benth.) J.R.Wheeler & N.G.Marchant

Synonyms
- Agonis sect. Taxandria Benth.; Agonis sect. Billotia Kuntze

= Taxandria (plant) =

Genus of flowering plants

Taxandria is a group of plants in the family Myrtaceae described as a genus in 2007. The entire genus is endemic to Western Australia, growing near the coast in the South West corner of the State.

Most species of Taxandria generally growing as tall shrubs, but Taxandria juniperina grows to tree size (up to 27m) and Taxandria linearifolia can grow as a small tree (up to 5m in height).

species

- Taxandria angustifolia (Schauer) J.R.Wheeler & N.G.Marchant
- Taxandria callistachys J.R.Wheeler & N.G.Marchant
- Taxandria floribunda (Turcz.) J.R.Wheeler & N.G.Marchant
- Taxandria fragrans (J.R.Wheeler & N.G.Marchant) J.R.Wheeler & N.G.Marchant
- Taxandria inundata J.R.Wheeler & N.G.Marchant
- Taxandria juniperina (Schauer) J.R.Wheeler & N.G.Marchant
- Taxandria linearifolia (DC.) J.R.Wheeler & N.G.Marchant
- Taxandria marginata (Labill.) J.R.Wheeler & N.G.Marchant
- Taxandria parviceps (Schauer) J.R.Wheeler & N.G.Marchant
- Taxandria spathulata (Schauer) J.R.Wheeler & N.G.Marchant
