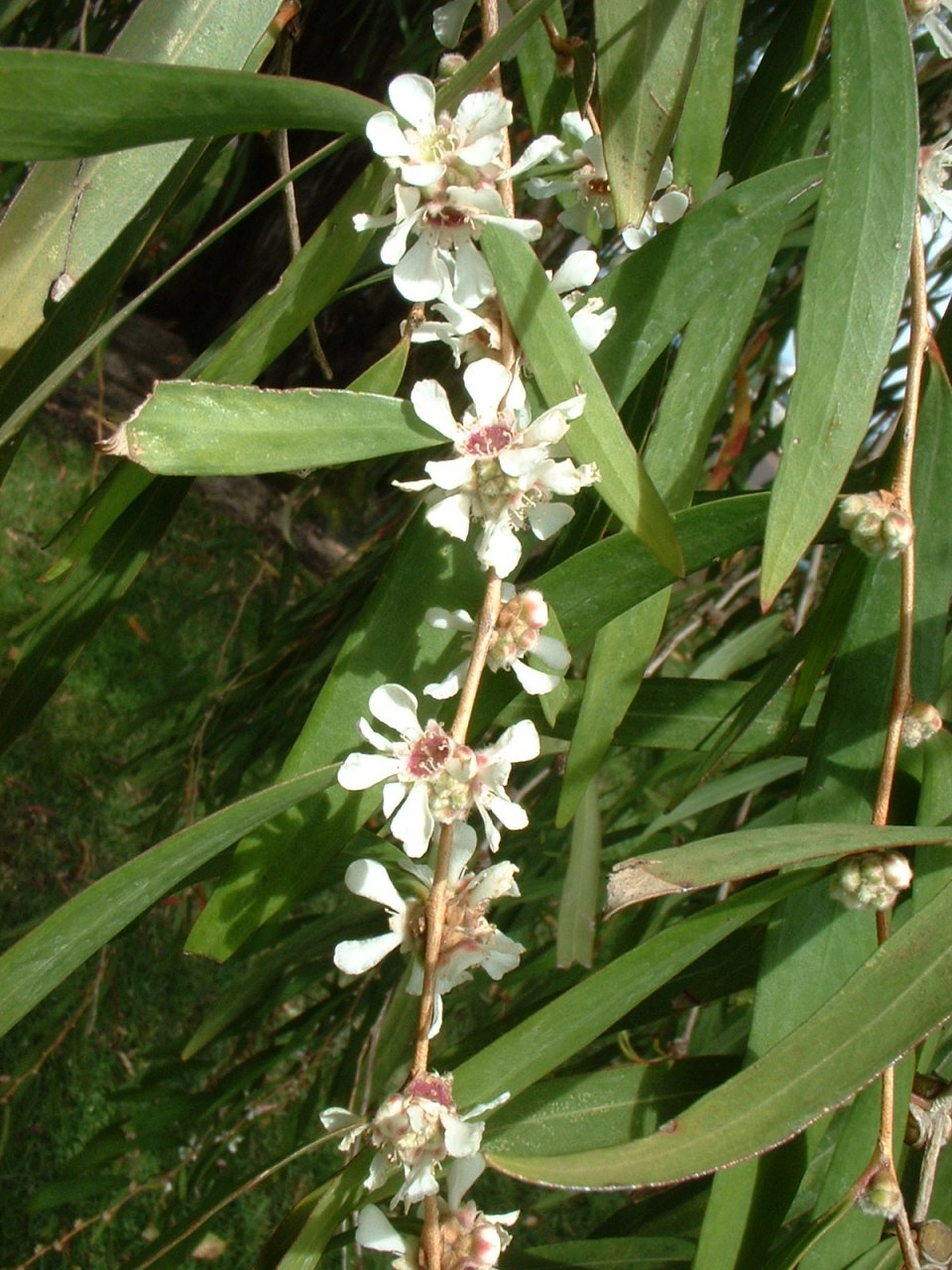
- Flowers of peppermint tree (Agonis flexuosa)

Scientific classification
- Kingdom: Plantae
- Clade: Tracheophytes
- Clade: Angiosperms
- Clade: Eudicots
- Clade: Rosids
- Order: Myrtales
- Family: Myrtaceae
- Subfamily: Myrtoideae
- Tribe: Leptospermeae; DC.

= Leptospermeae =

Tribe of flowering plants

Leptospermeae is a tribe in the plant family Myrtaceae from south-east Asia and Oceania with a main diversity center in Australia.

== Genera ==
- Agonis (Australia)
- Asteromyrtus (Australia)
- Homalospermum (Australia)
- Kunzea (Australia, New Zealand)
- Leptospermum
- Neofabricia (Australia)
- Paragonis (Australia)
- Pericalymma (Australia)
- Taxandria (Australia)
