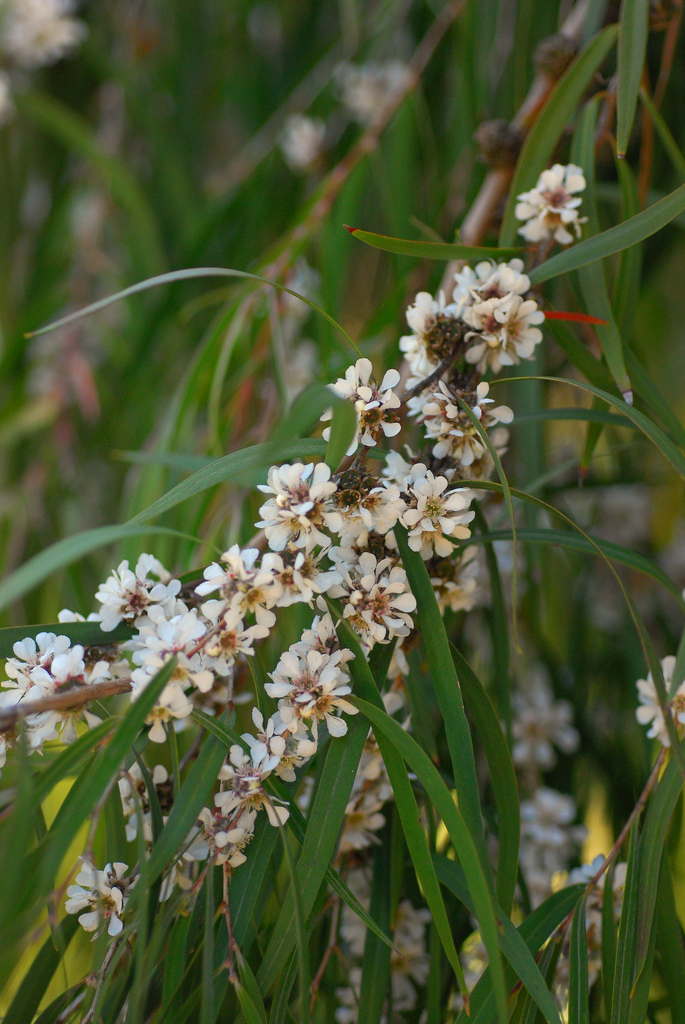
- Flowers of Agonis flexuosa

Scientific classification
- Kingdom: Plantae
- Clade: Tracheophytes
- Clade: Angiosperms
- Clade: Eudicots
- Clade: Rosids
- Order: Myrtales
- Family: Myrtaceae
- Subfamily: Myrtoideae
- Tribe: Leptospermeae
- Genus: Agonis (DC.) Sweet

Synonyms
- Billotia R.Br. ex G.Don 1832 nom. illeg.; Paragonis J.R.Wheeler & N.G.Marchant

= Agonis =

Genus of trees

Agonis is a genus of flowering plants in the plant family Myrtaceae. All are endemic to Western Australia, growing near the coast in the south west. Plants in the genus Agonis are shrubs or trees with bisexual flowers arranged in heads in leaf axils with 5 sepals and usually 5 white petals, each with 15 to 30 stamens arranged opposite the sepals, and the fruit a woody capsule.

== Description ==
Plants in the genus Agonis are shrubs or trees, the leaves simple with small glands. The flowers are bisexual with a pair of bracteoles and a bract at the base. The flowers have a leathery floral tube, 5 egg-shaped or triangular sepals, 5 white petals and 15 to 30 stamens in a single whorl with 6 or 7 stamens opposite the sepals and none opposite the petals. The ovary is inferior with the style in a depression at the top of the ovary, and the fruit is a woody capsule with winged seeds.

== Taxonomy ==
This genus was first formally described in 1828 by Augustin Pyramus de Candolle as Leptospermum sect. Agonis in his Prodromus Systematis Naturalis Regni Vegetabilis. In 1830, Robert Sweet raised the genus Agonis based on de Candolle's section Agonis, in Sweet's Hortus Britannicus.

== Species list ==
The following is a list of Agonis species accepted by Plants of the World Online as at August 2024:

- Agonis baxteri (Benth.) J.R.Wheeler & N.G.Marchant
- Agonis flexuosa (Willd.) Sweet - Western Australian peppermint, Swan River peppermint, or willow myrtle
- Agonis grandiflora Benth.
- Agonis theiformis Schauer
- Agonis undulata Benth.
