= List of descriptive plant species epithets (I–Z) =

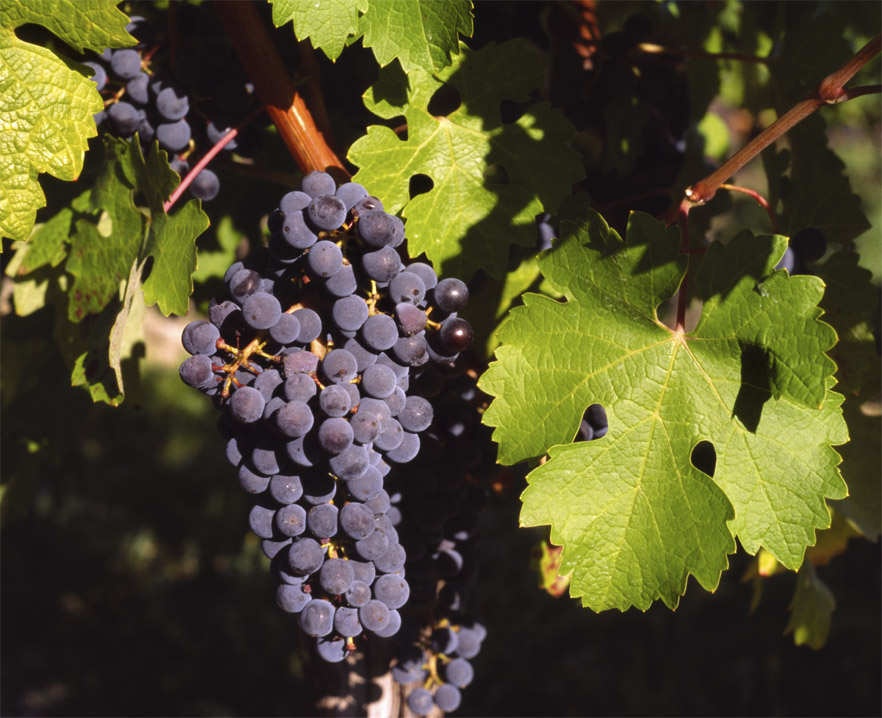
Vitis vinifera ("wine-bearing")

Since the first printing of Carl Linnaeus's Species Plantarum in 1753, plants have been assigned one epithet or name for their species and one name for their genus, a grouping of related species. These scientific names have been catalogued in a variety of works, including Stearn's Dictionary of Plant Names for Gardeners. William Stearn (1911–2001) was one of the pre-eminent British botanists of the 20th century: a Librarian of the Royal Horticultural Society, a president of the Linnean Society and the original drafter of the International Code of Nomenclature for Cultivated Plants.

The first column below lists seed-bearing species epithets from Stearn's Dictionary, Latin for Gardeners by Lorraine Harrison, The A to Z of Plant Names by Allen Coombes, The Gardener's Botanical by Ross Bayton, and the glossary of Stearn's Botanical Latin. Epithets from proper nouns, proper adjectives, and two or more nouns are excluded, along with epithets used only in species names that are no longer widely accepted. Classical and modern meanings are provided in the third column, along with citations to Charlton T. Lewis's An Elementary Latin Dictionary. (Note: Words in the third column following "from" are related words from Classical Latin. The Latin and Latinised Greek words in the first column have masculine endings. If the genus is feminine, the -us ending generally becomes -a, -is is unchanged, and -er becomes -era, or occasionally -ra, as noted; other endings remain unchanged. For a neuter genus, -us becomes -um, -is becomes -e and -er becomes -erum, or occasionally -rum.)

== Key ==
LG = language: (L)atin or (G)reek
L = derived from Latin, or both Classical Latin and Greek (unless otherwise noted)
G = derived from Greek
H = listed by Harrison, and (except as noted) by Bayton
D = listed in Stearn's Dictionary
S = listed in Stearn's Botanical Latin
DS = listed in Stearn's Dictionary, with the word or root word listed in Botanical Latin
C = listed by Coombes

== Epithets ==
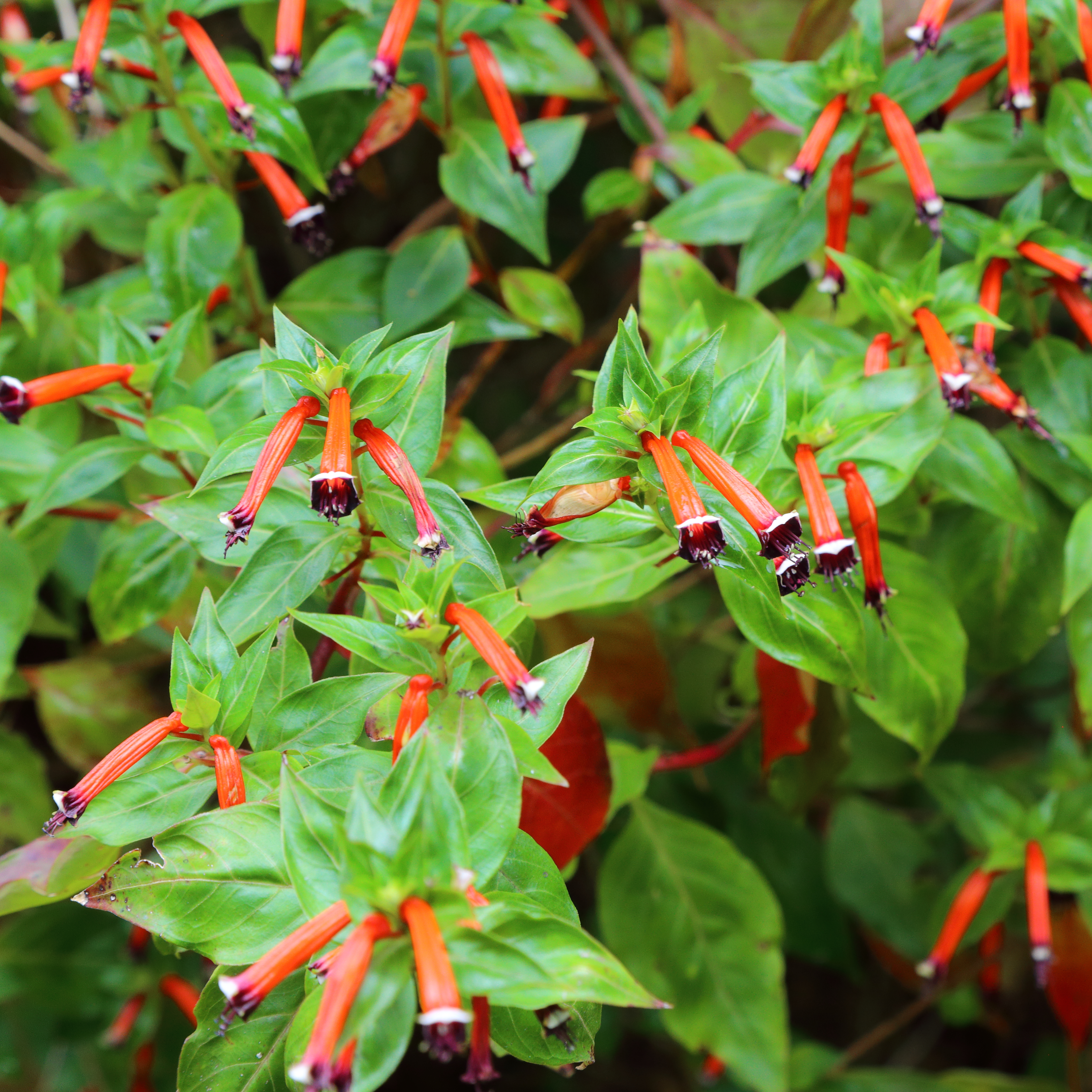
Cuphea ignea

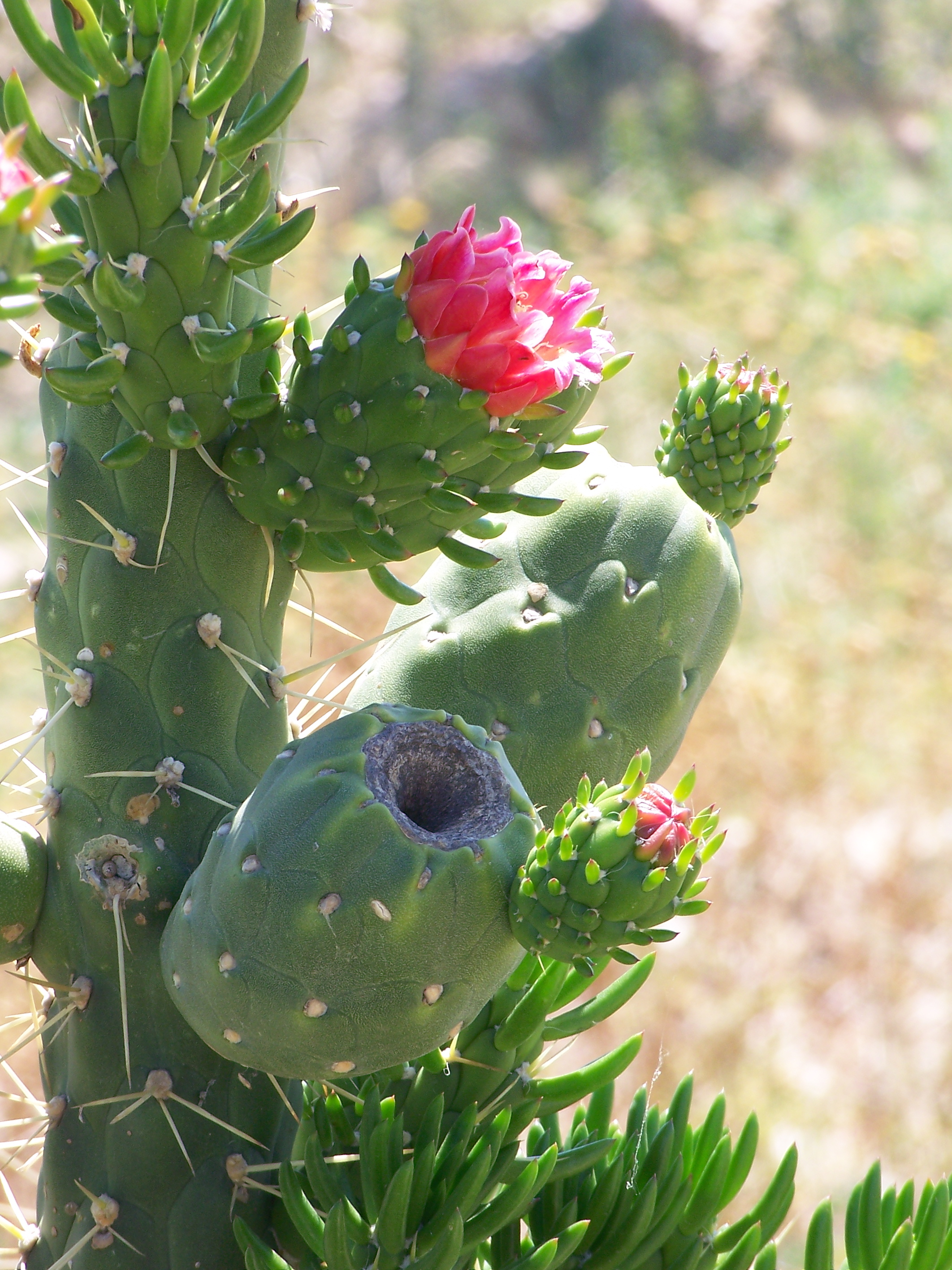
Cylindropuntia imbricata

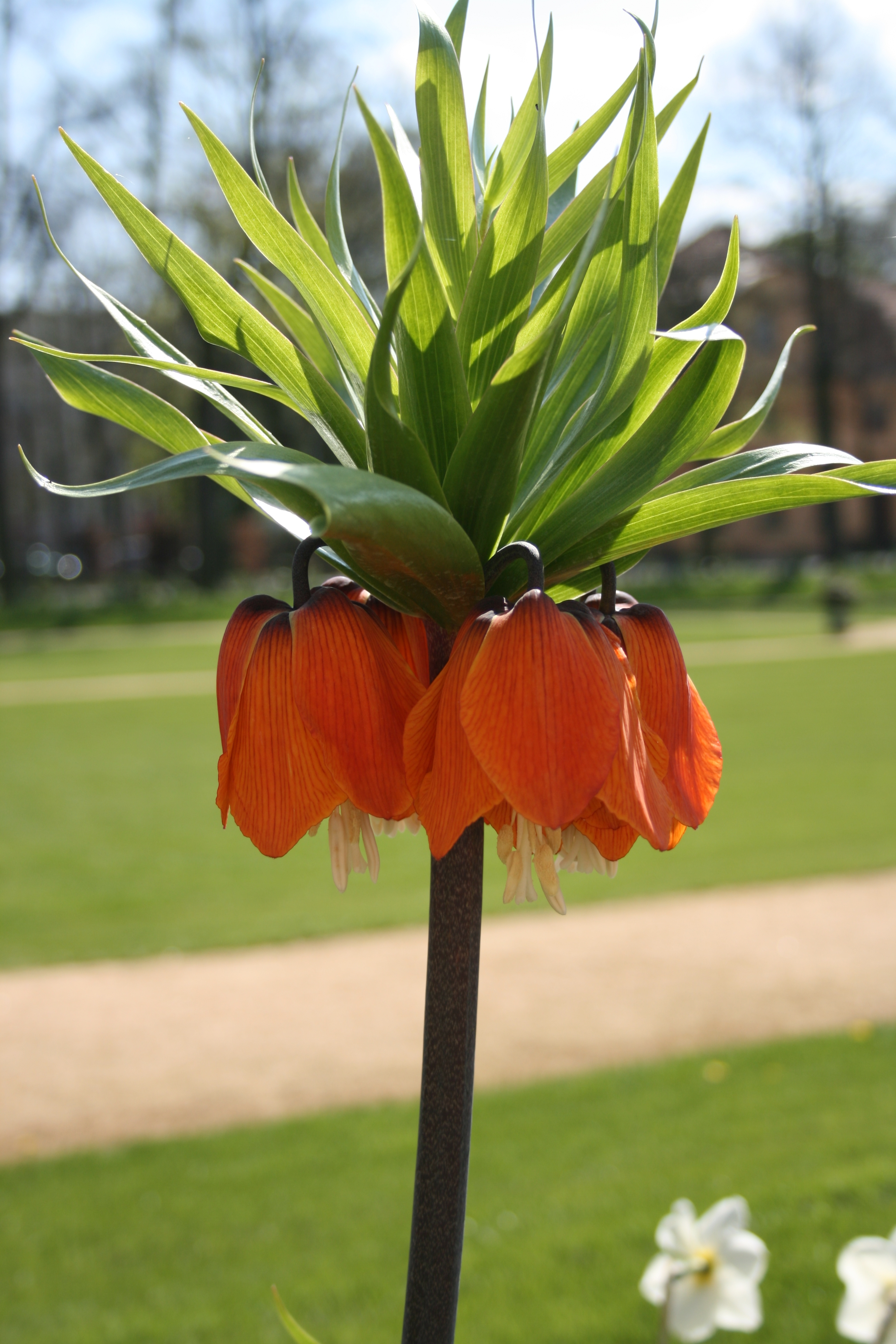
Fritillaria imperialis

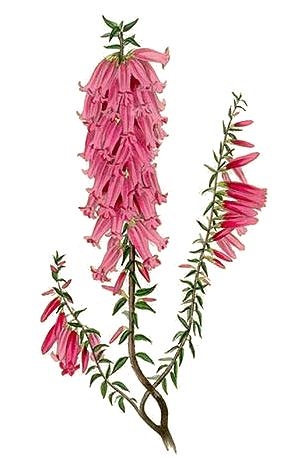
Illustration of Epacris impressa

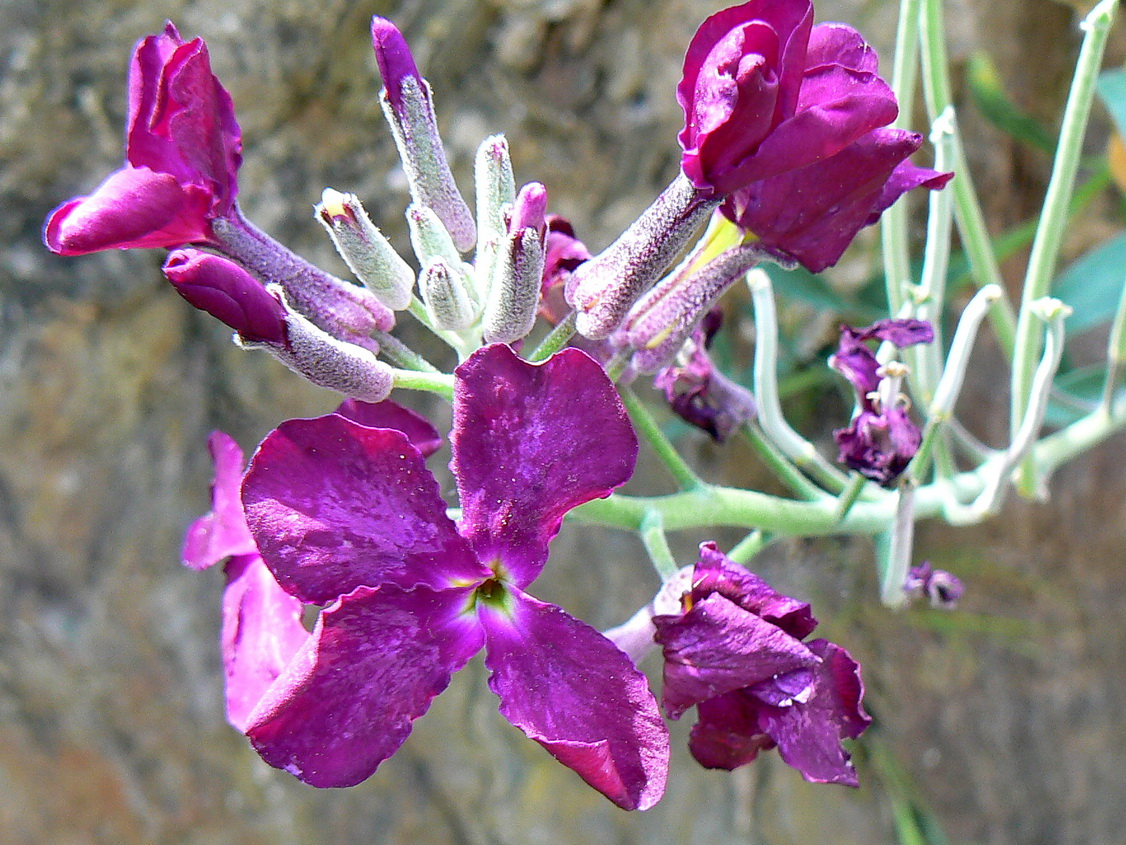
Matthiola incana

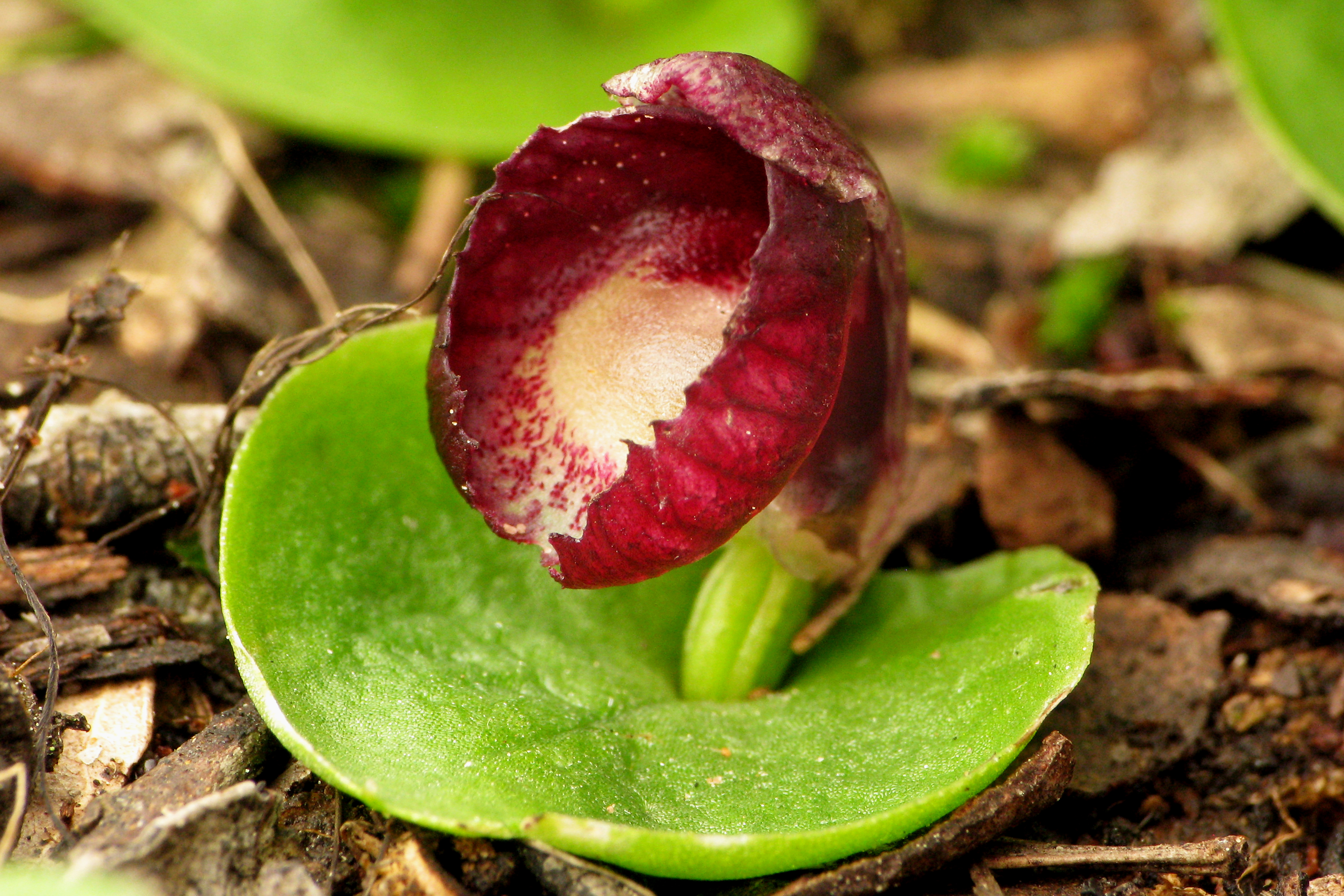
Corybas incurvus

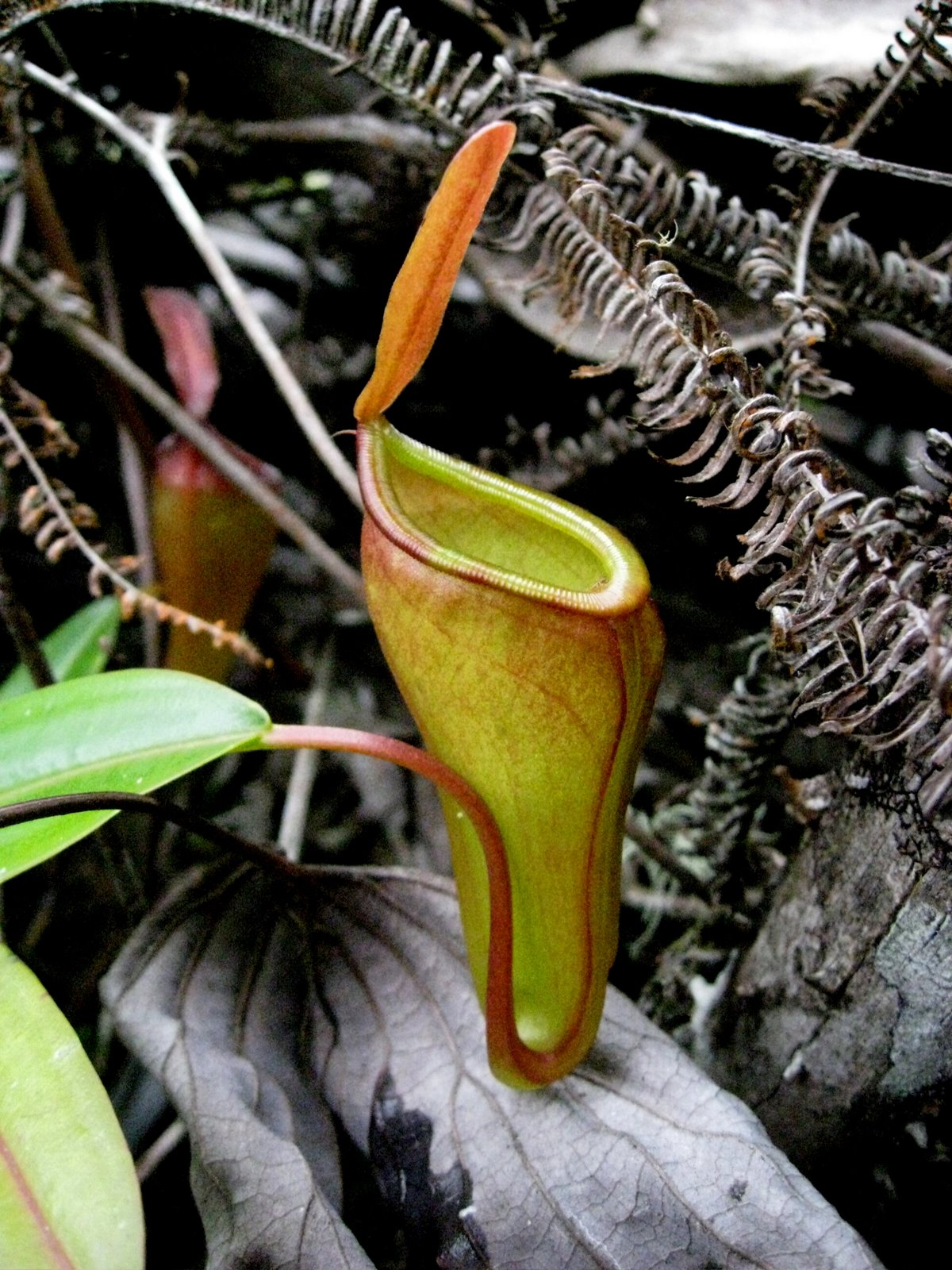
Nepenthes inermis

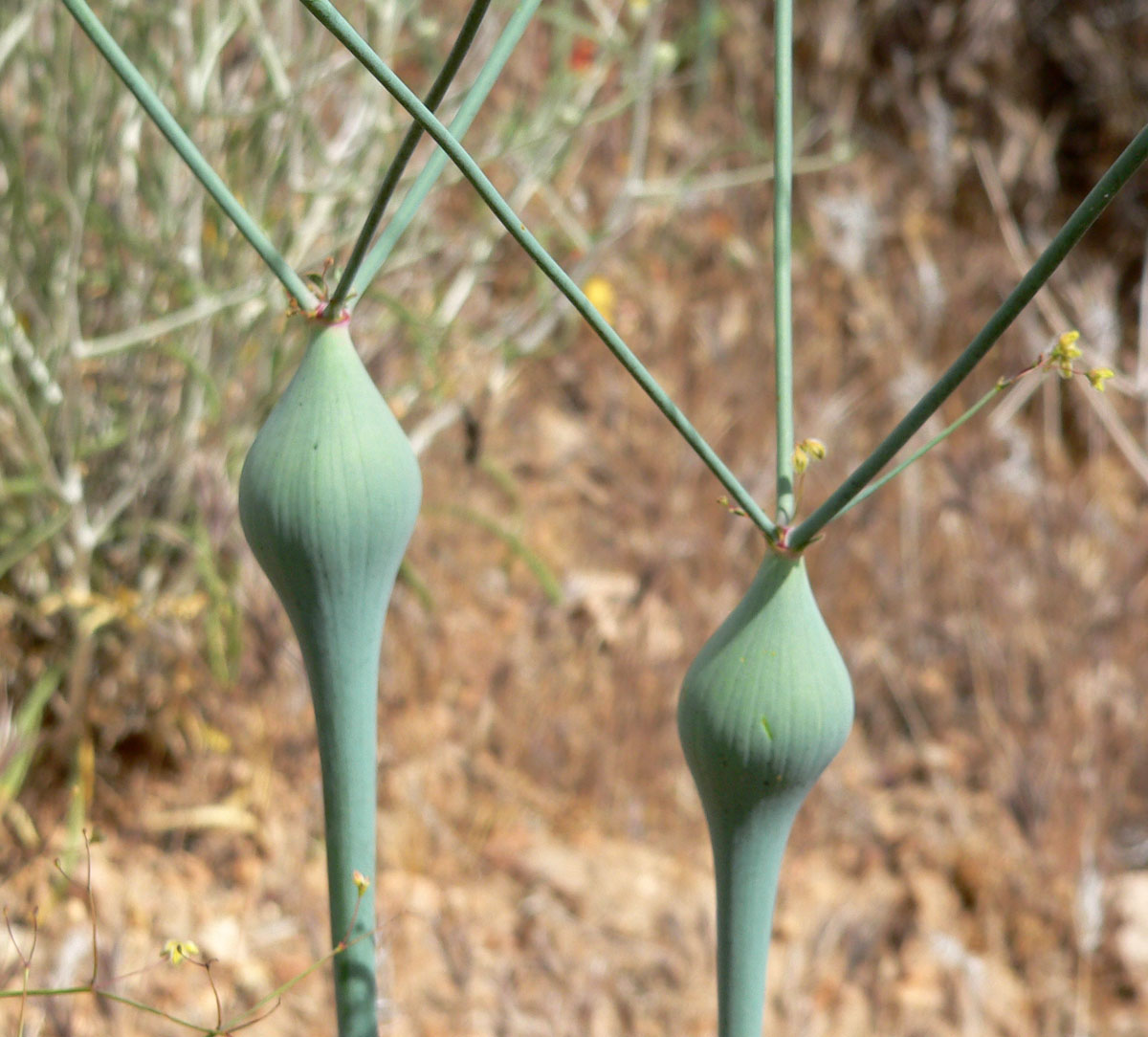
Eriogonum inflatum

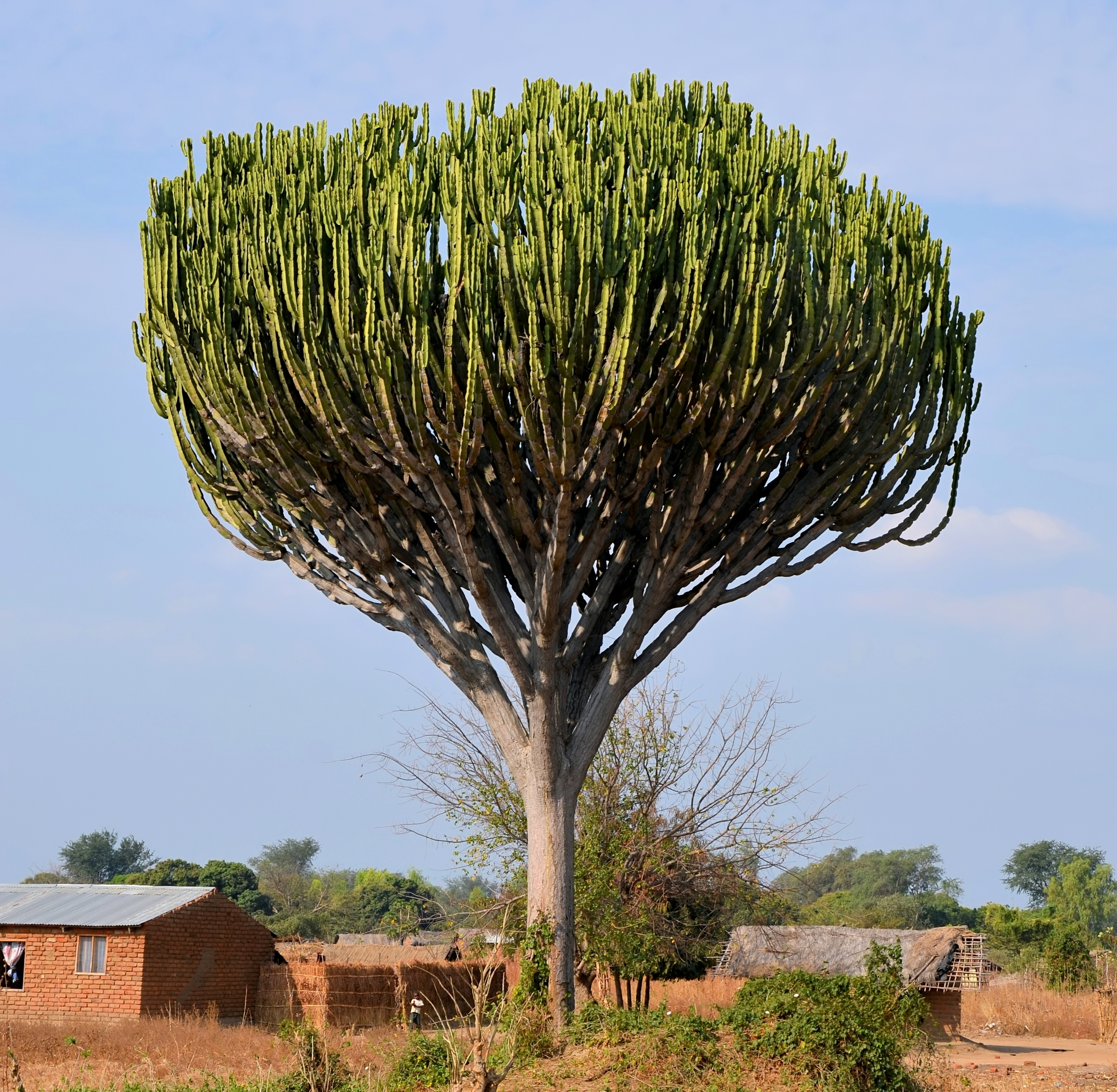
Euphorbia ingens

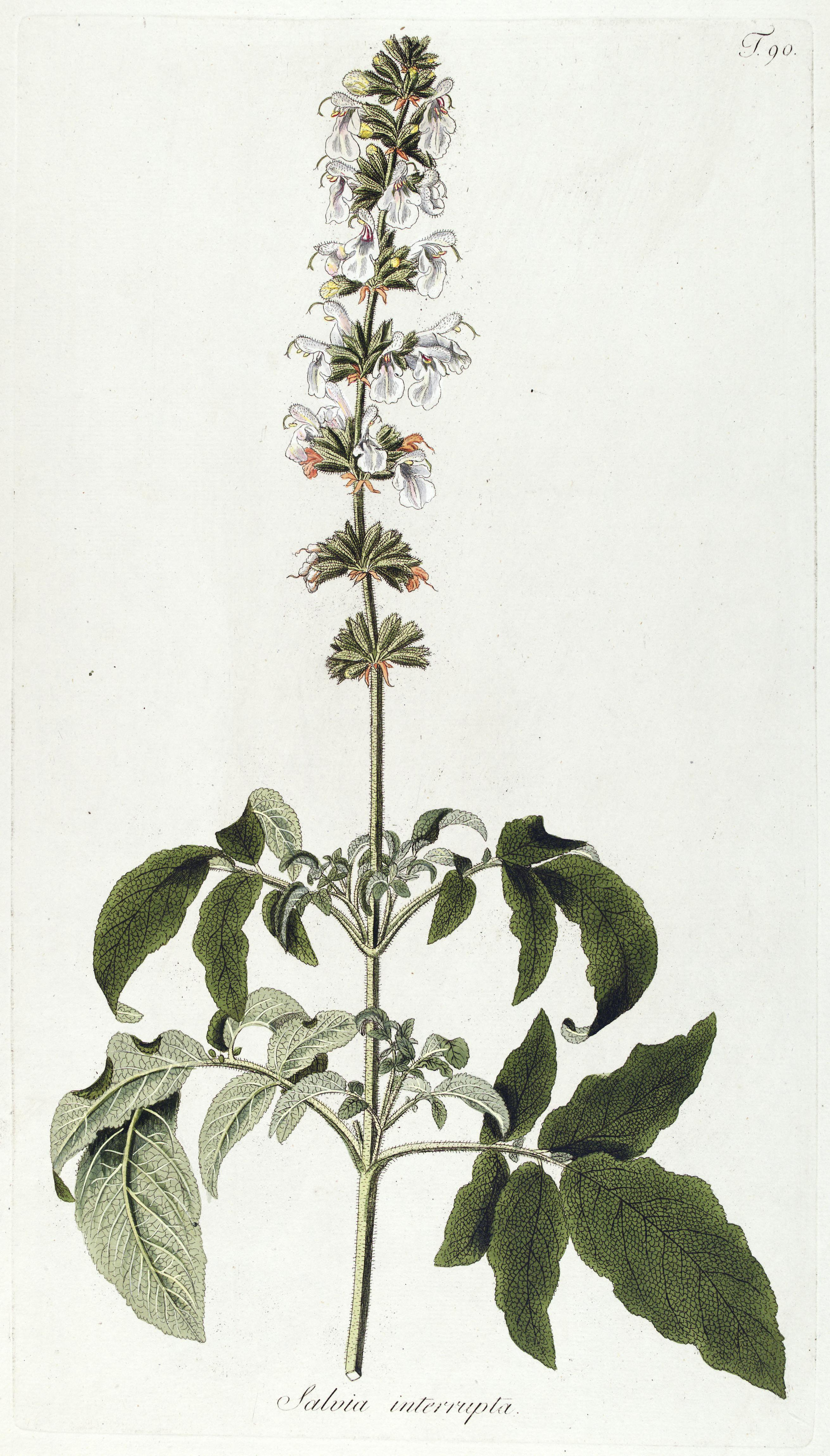
Illustration of Salvia interrupta

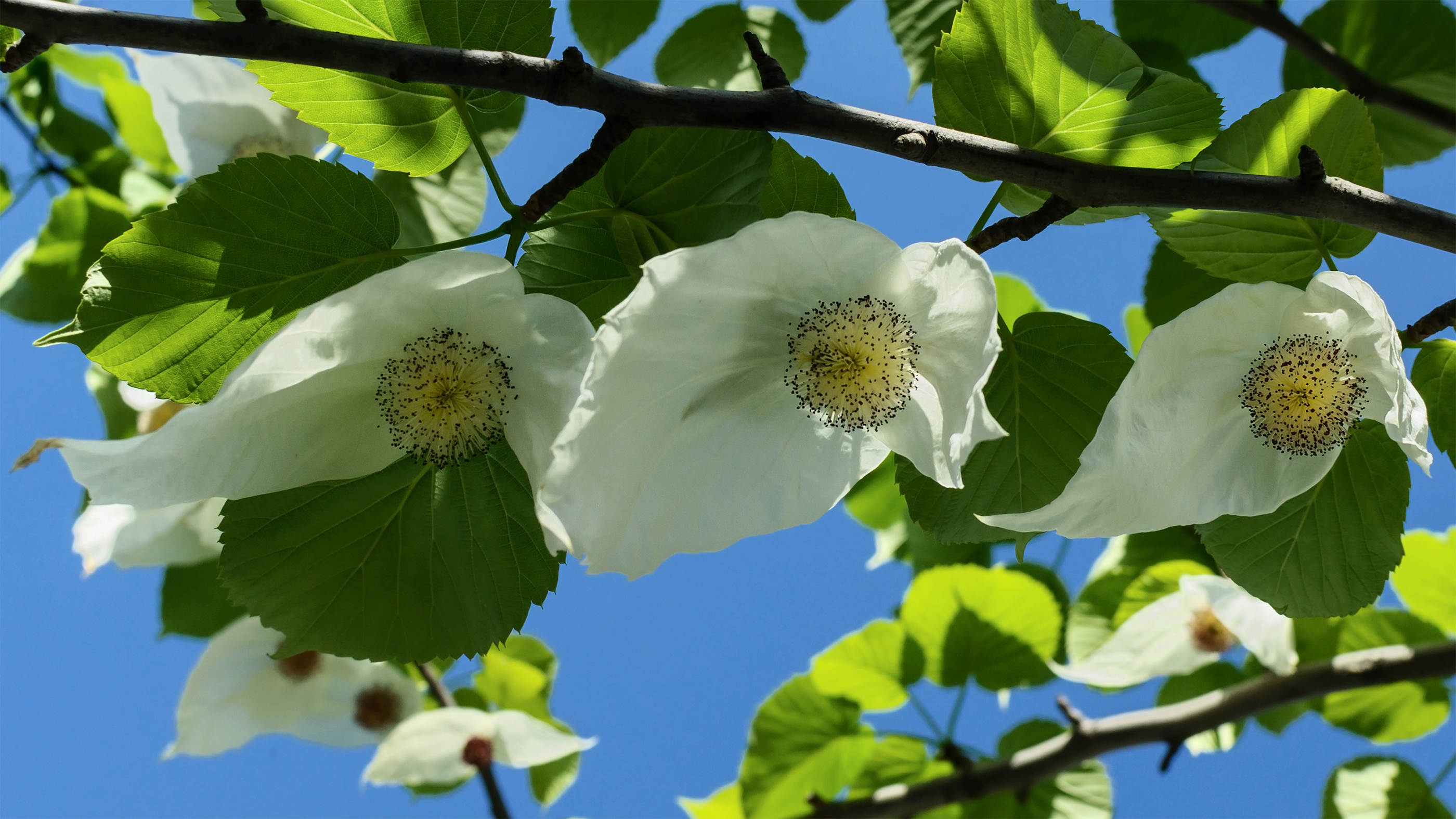
Davidia involucrata

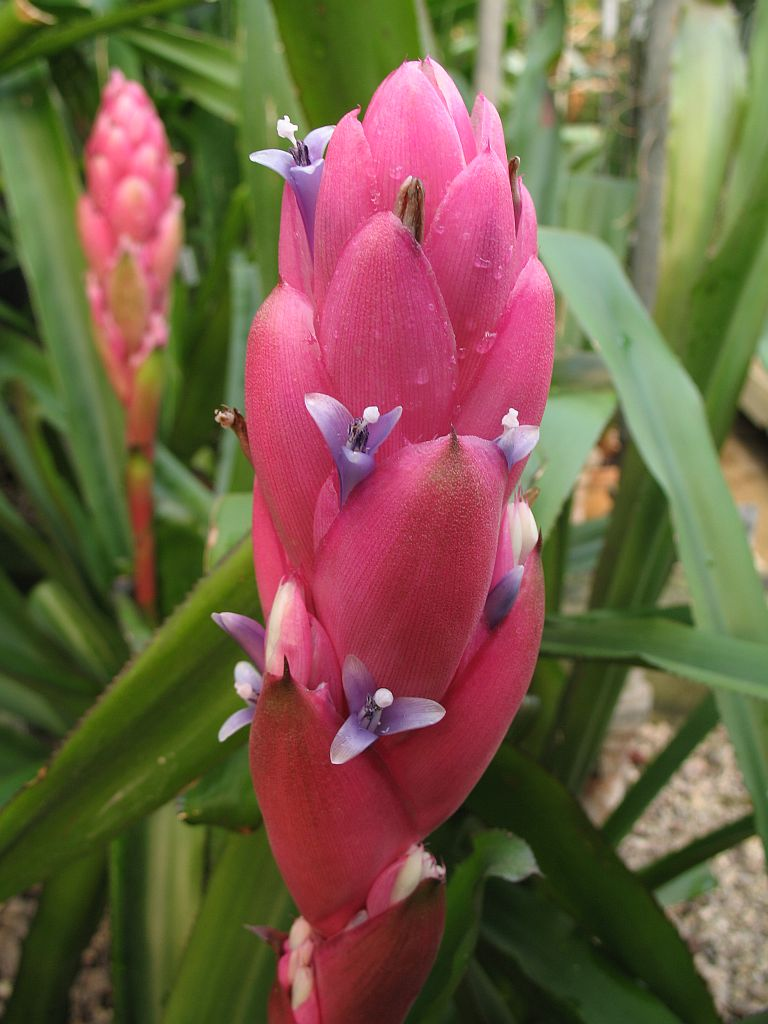
Portea kermesina

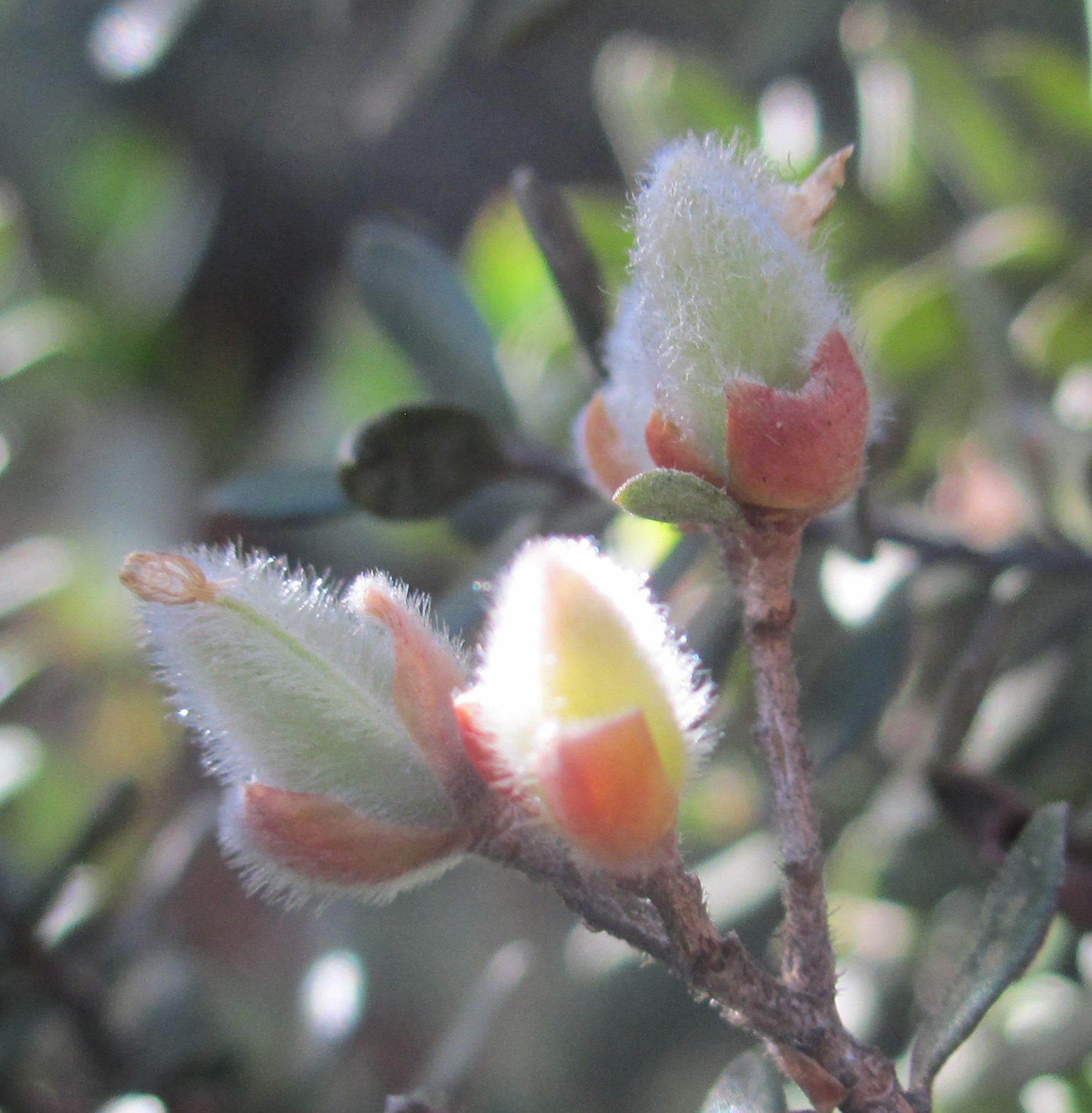
Leptospermum lanigerum

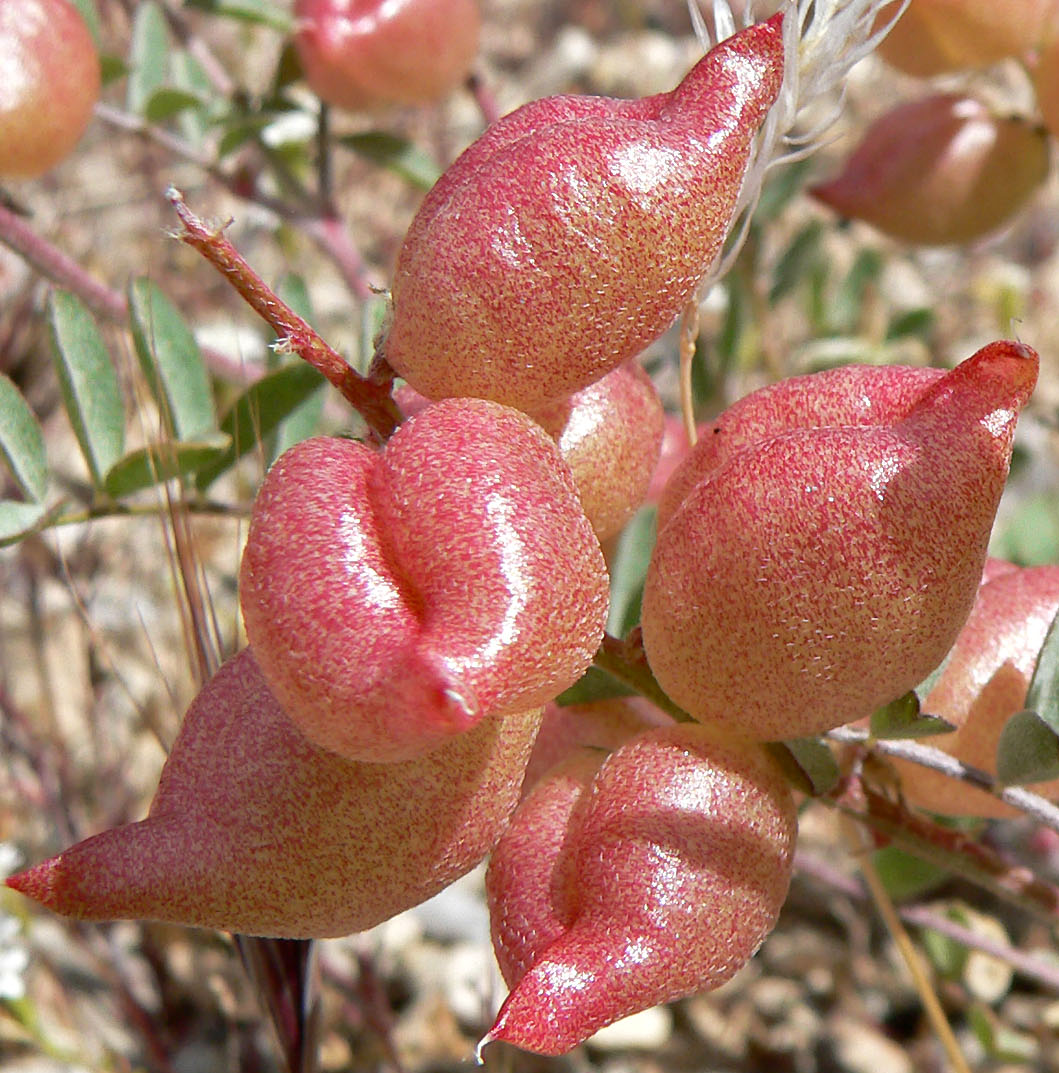
Astragalus lentiginosus

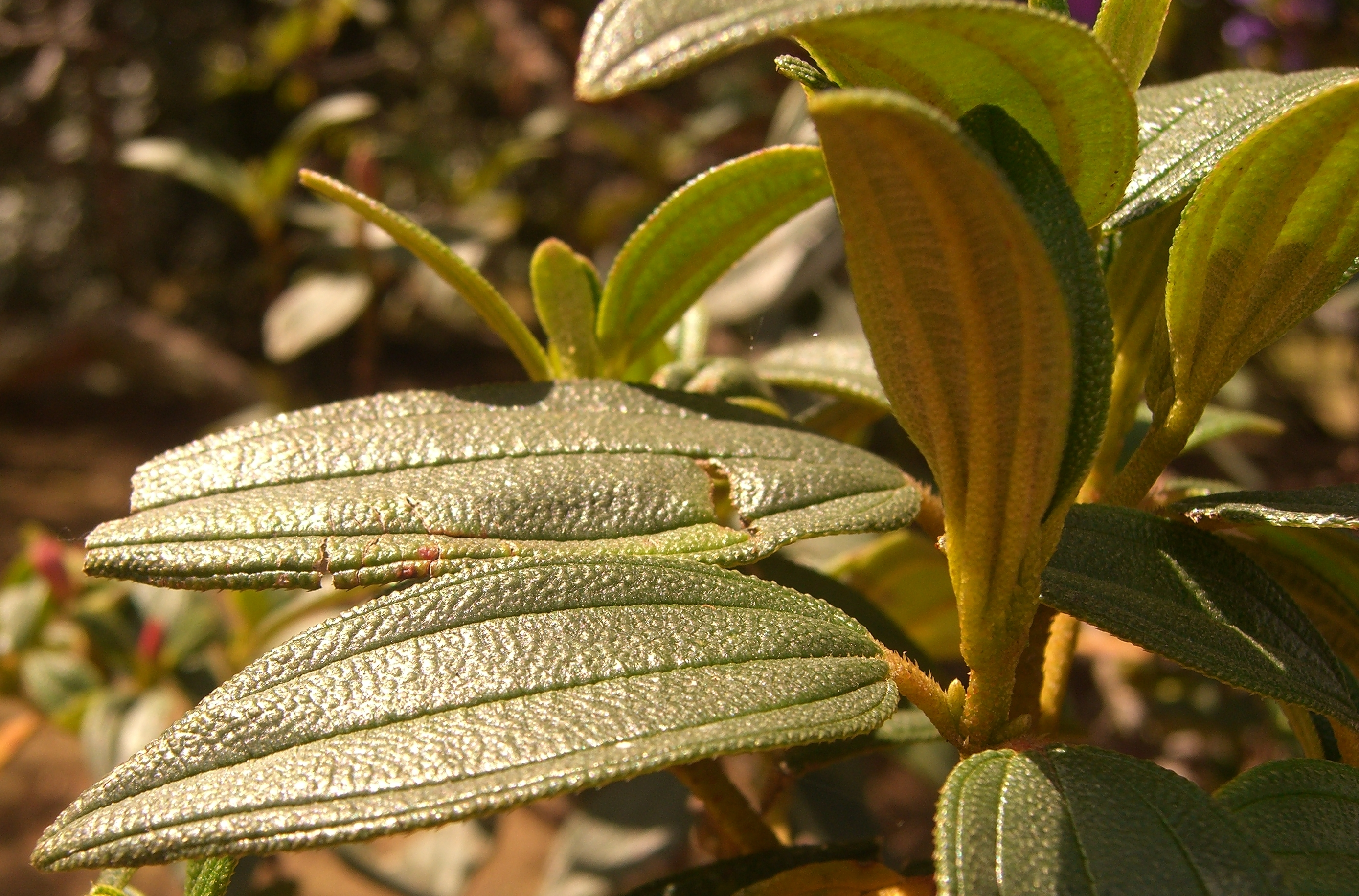
Andesanthus lepidotus

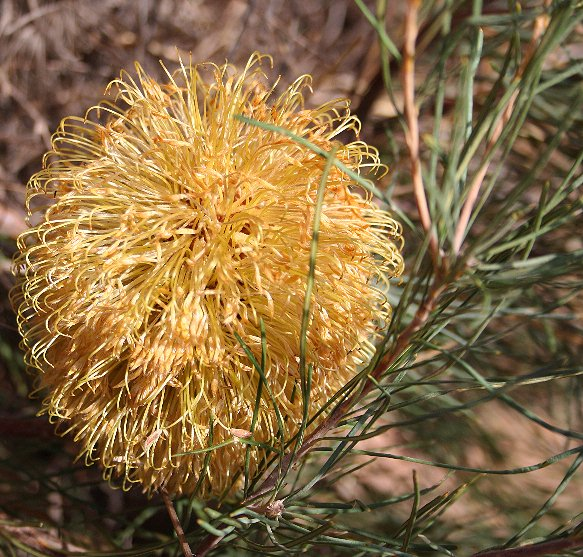
Banksia leptophylla

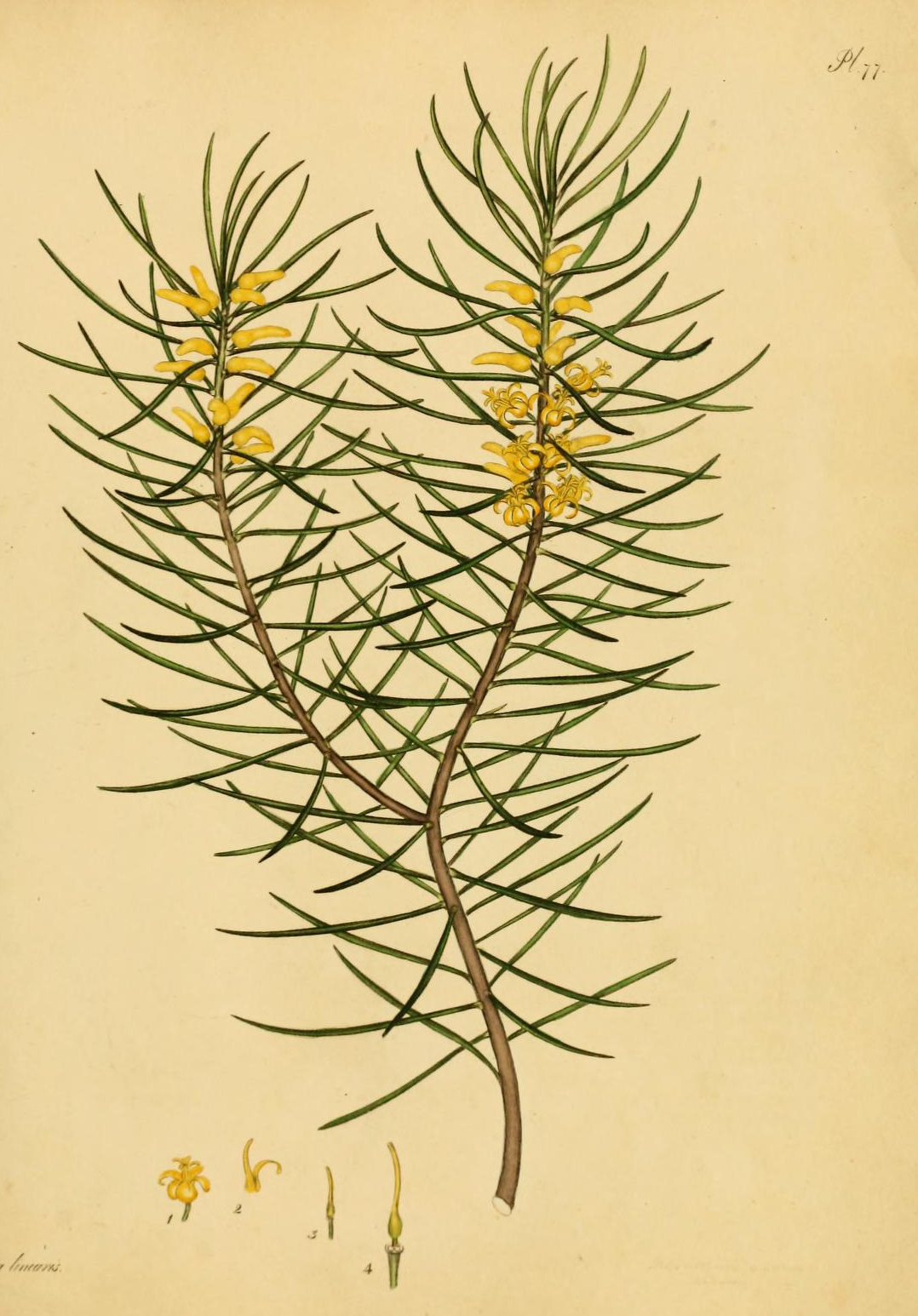
Illustration of Persoonia linearis

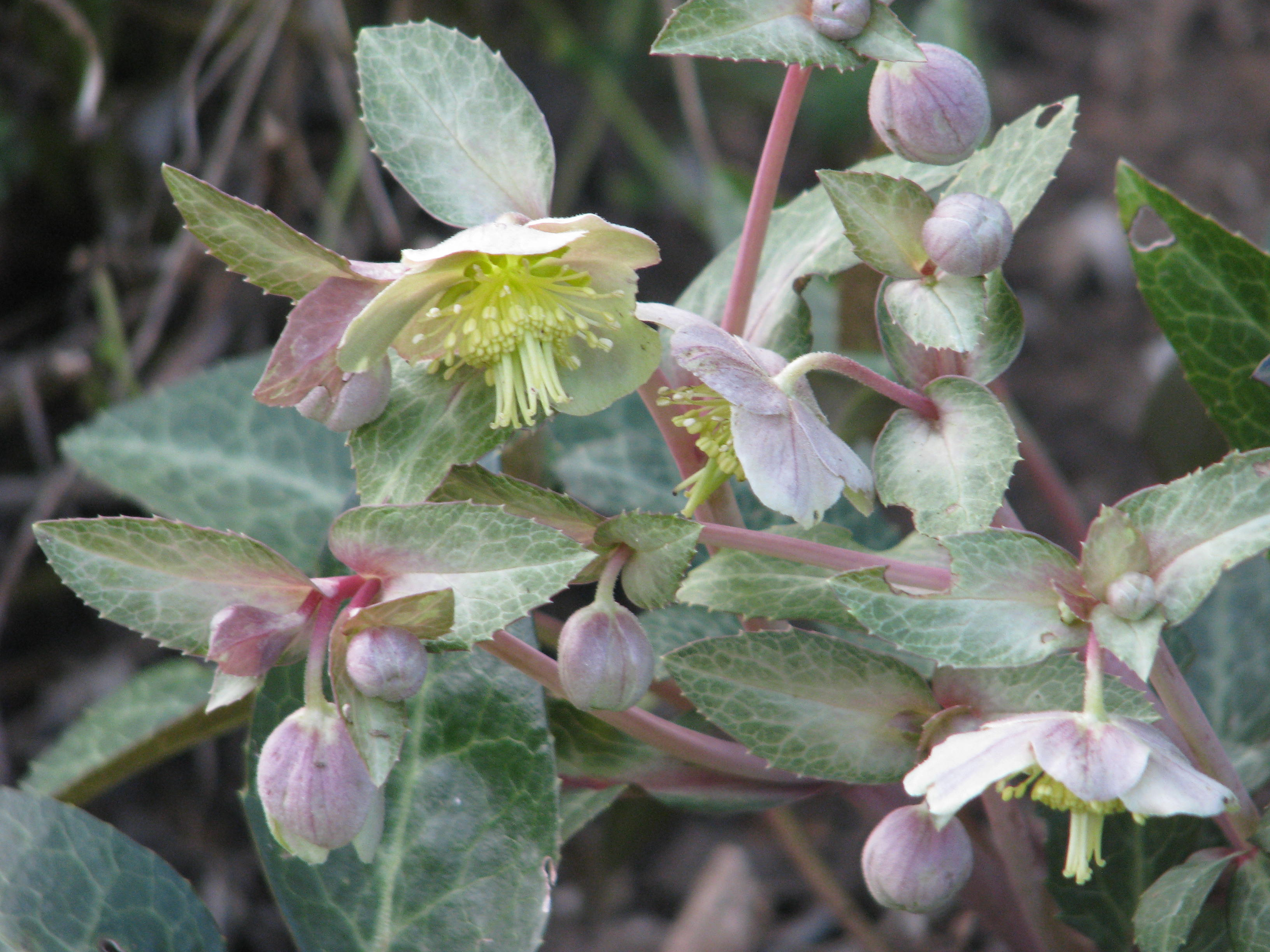
Helleborus lividus

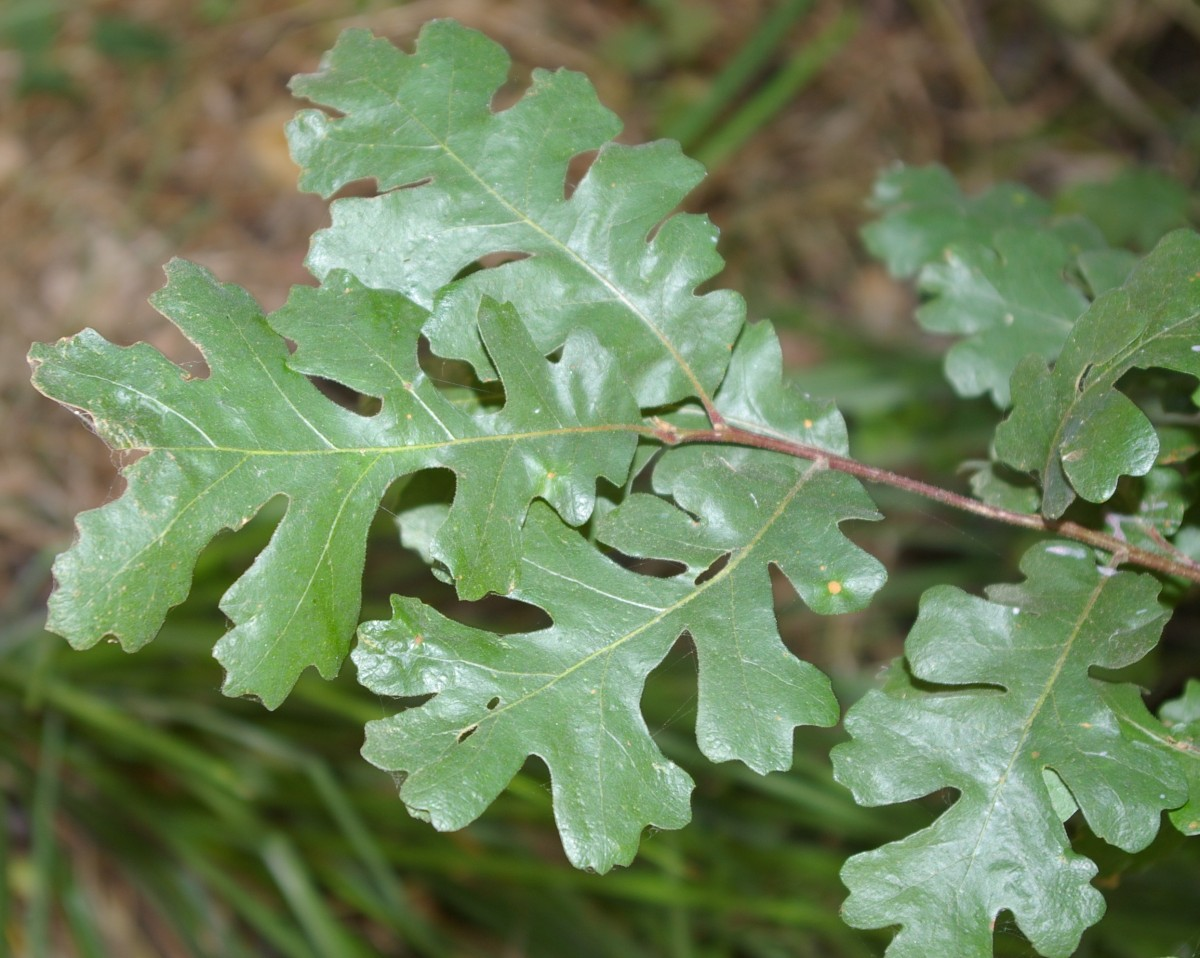
Quercus lobata

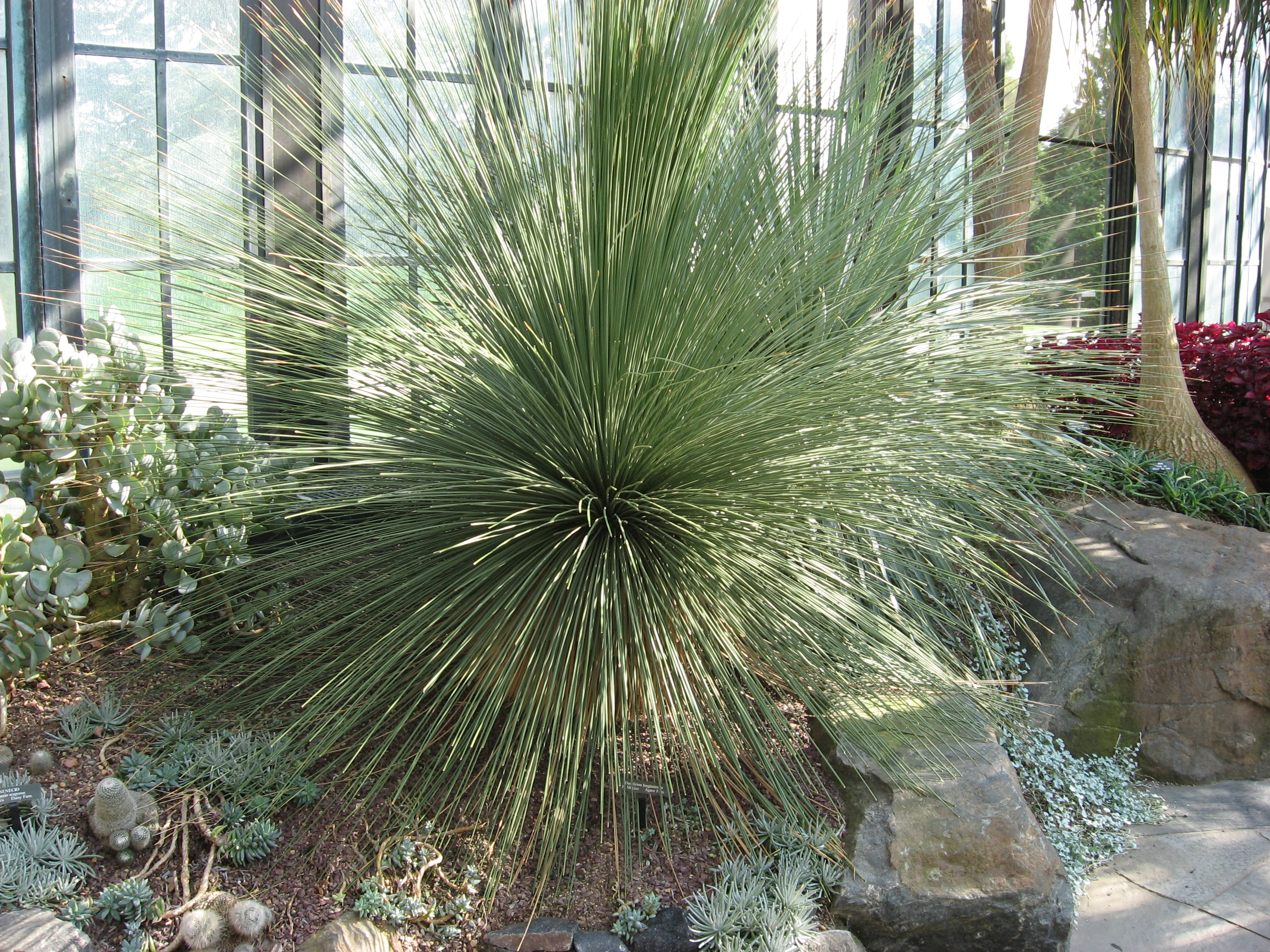
Dasylirion longissimum

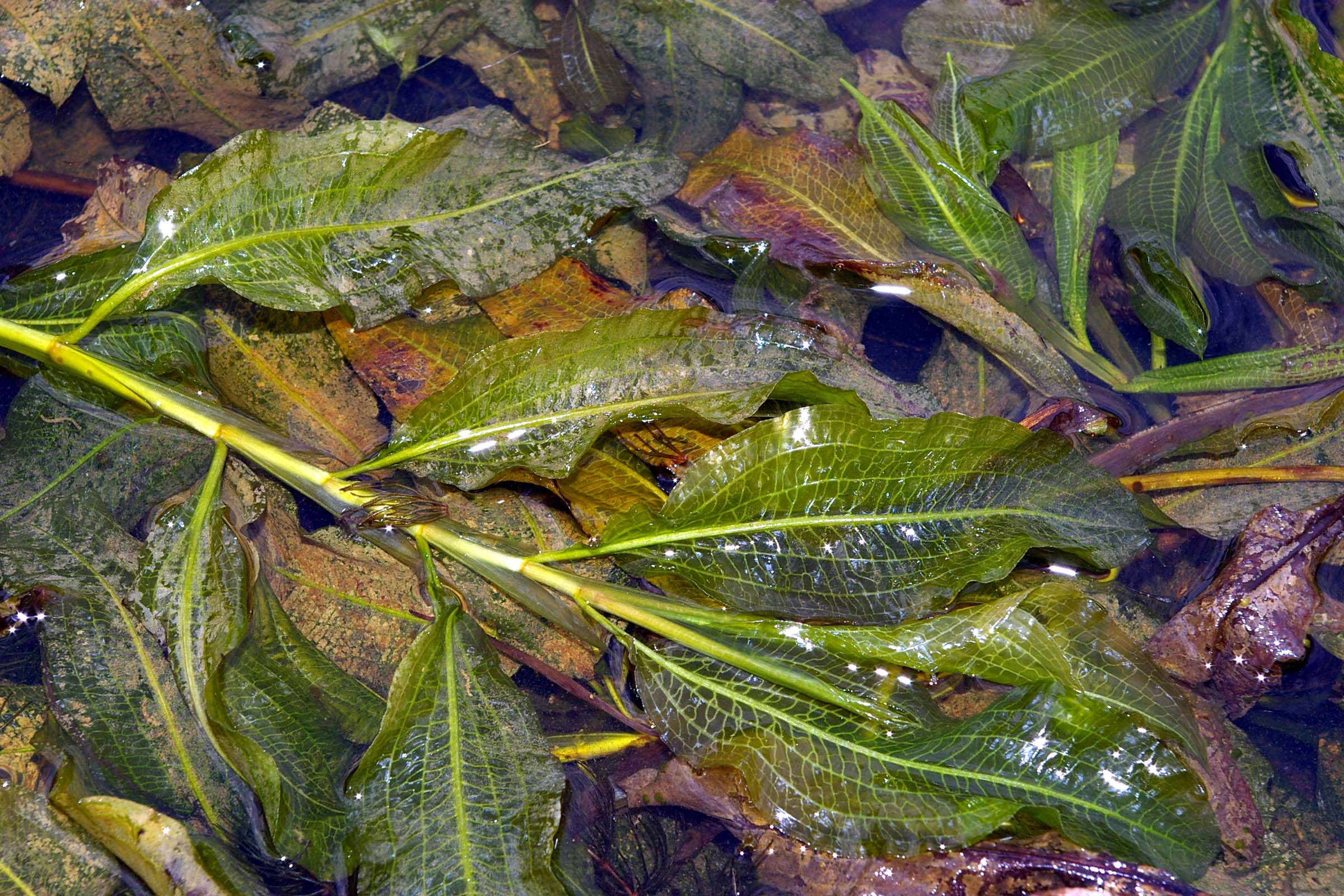
Potamogeton lucens

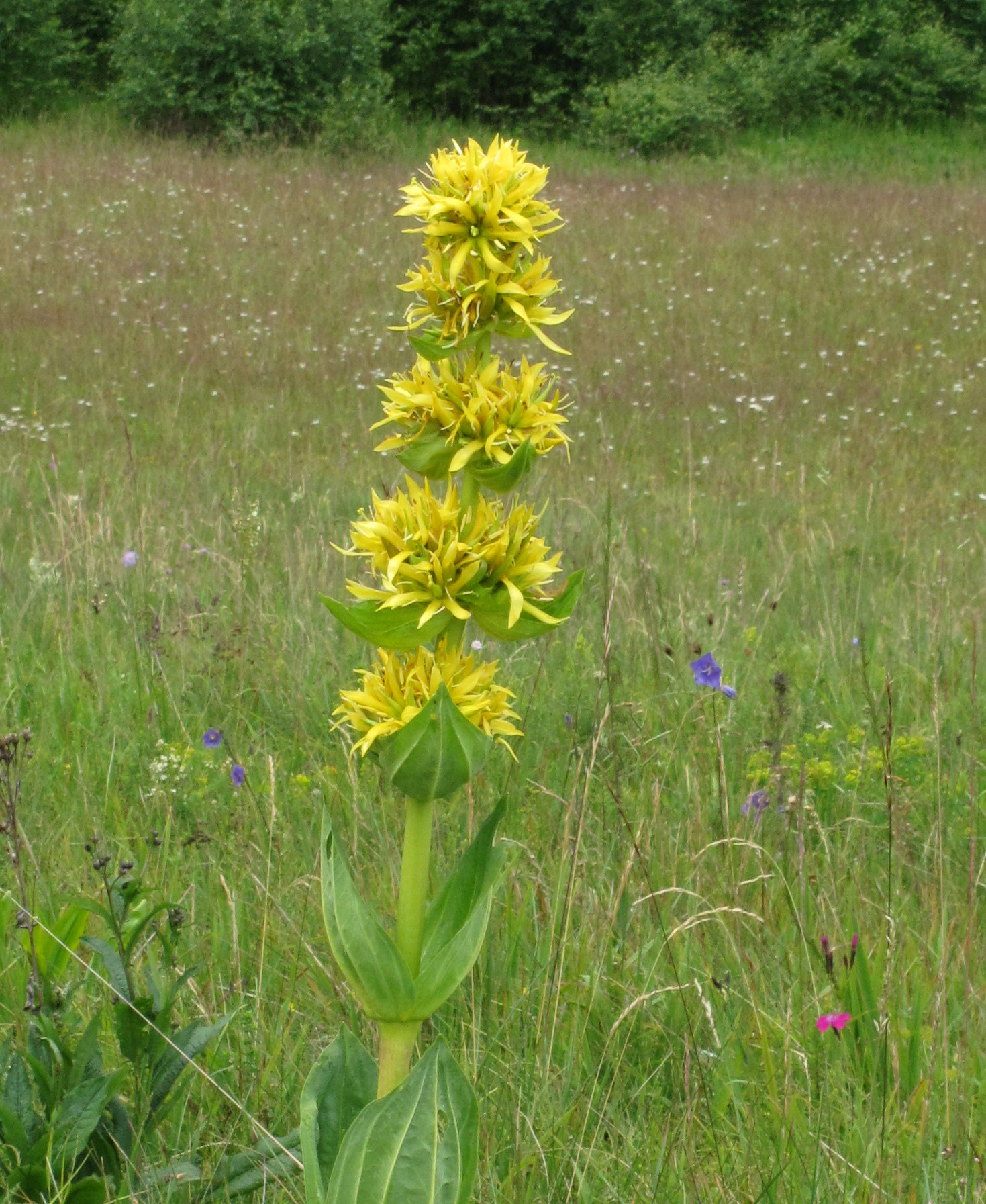
Gentiana lutea

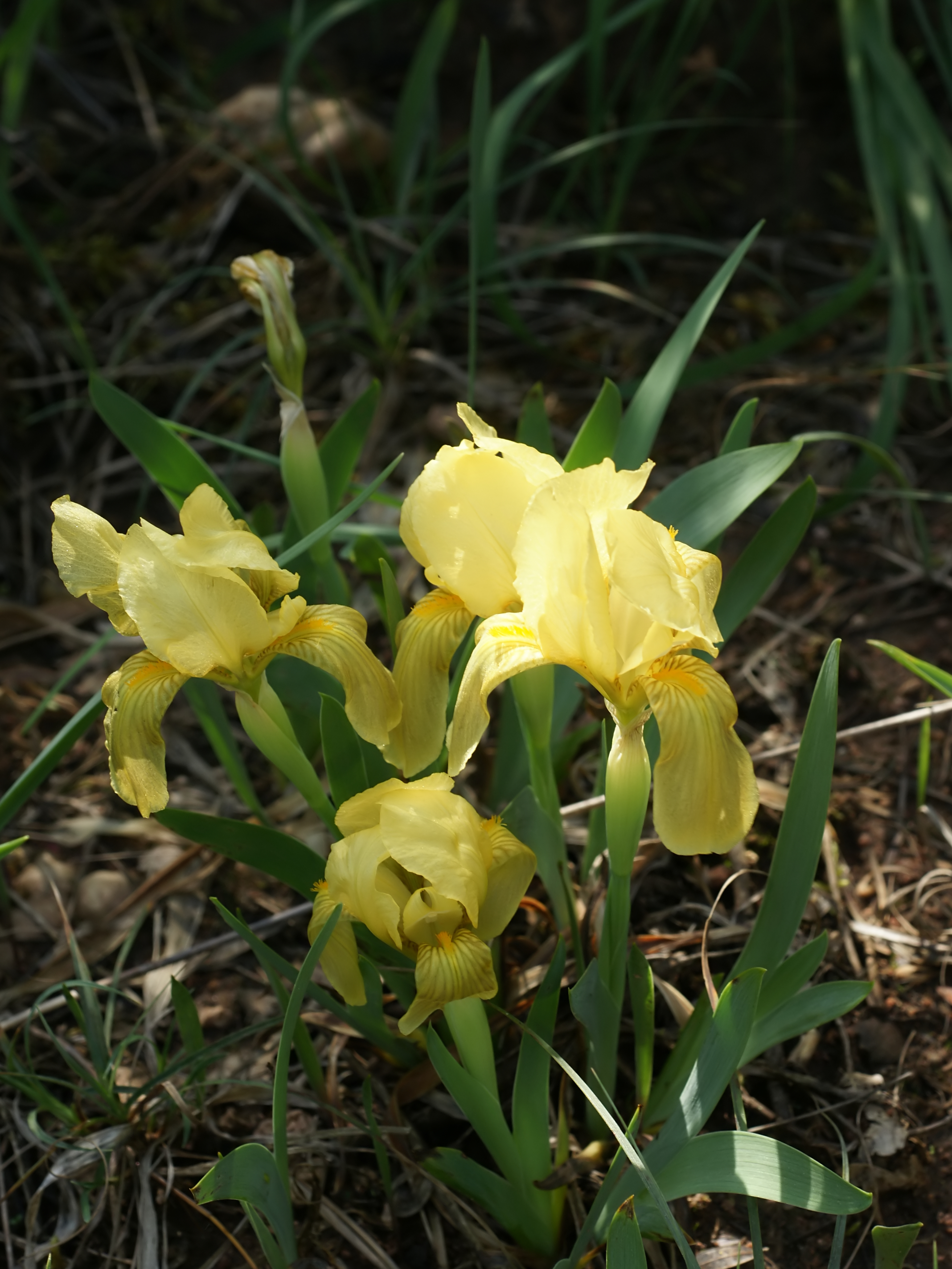
Iris lutescens

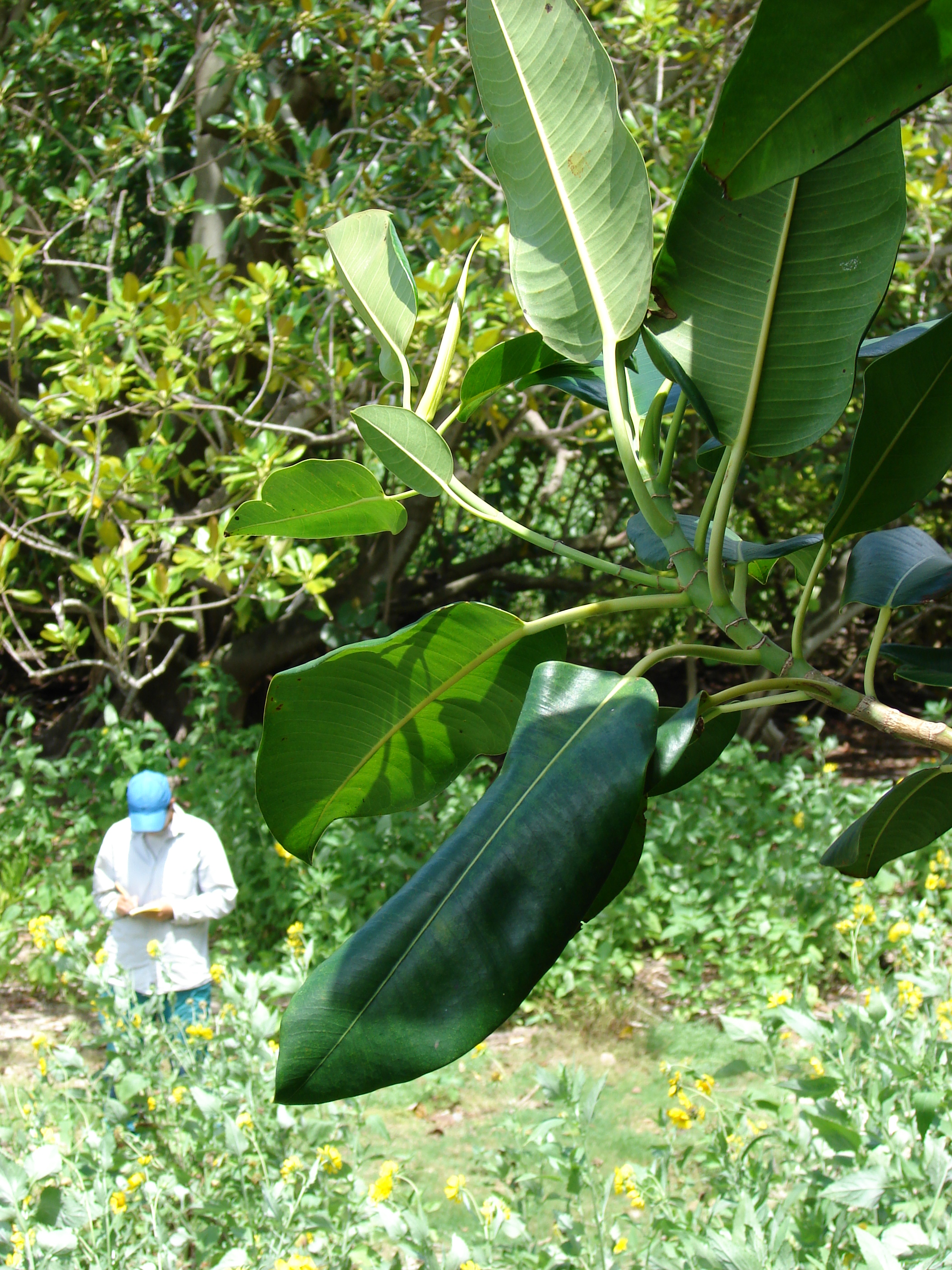
Ficus macrophylla

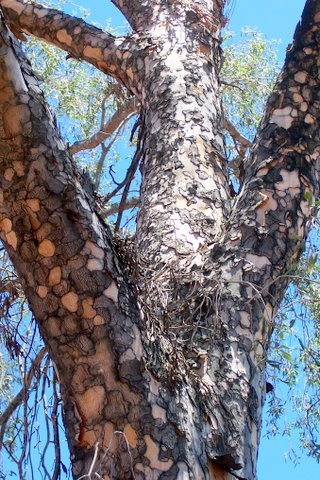
Flindersia maculosa

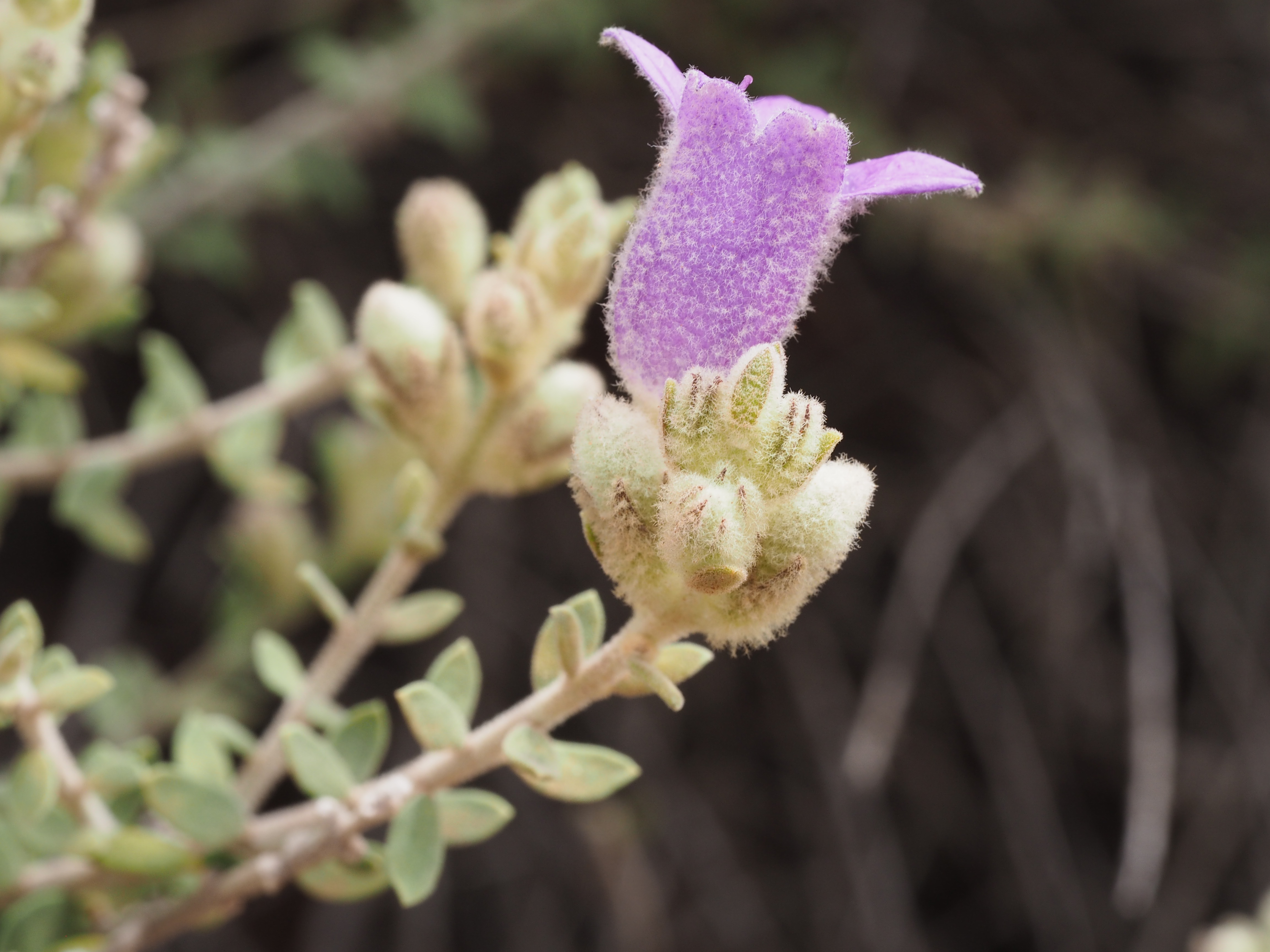
Eremophila malacoides

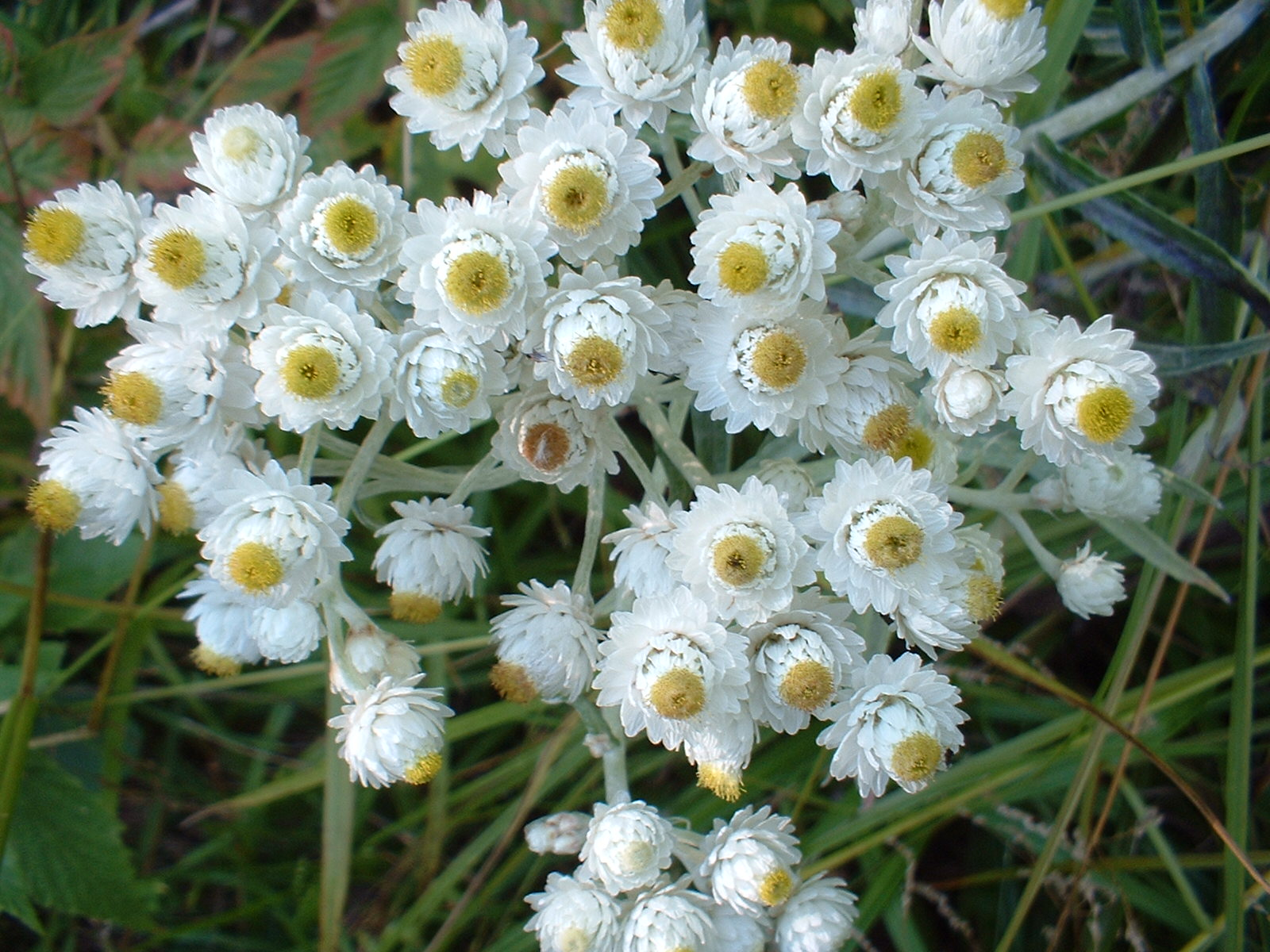
Anaphalis margaritacea

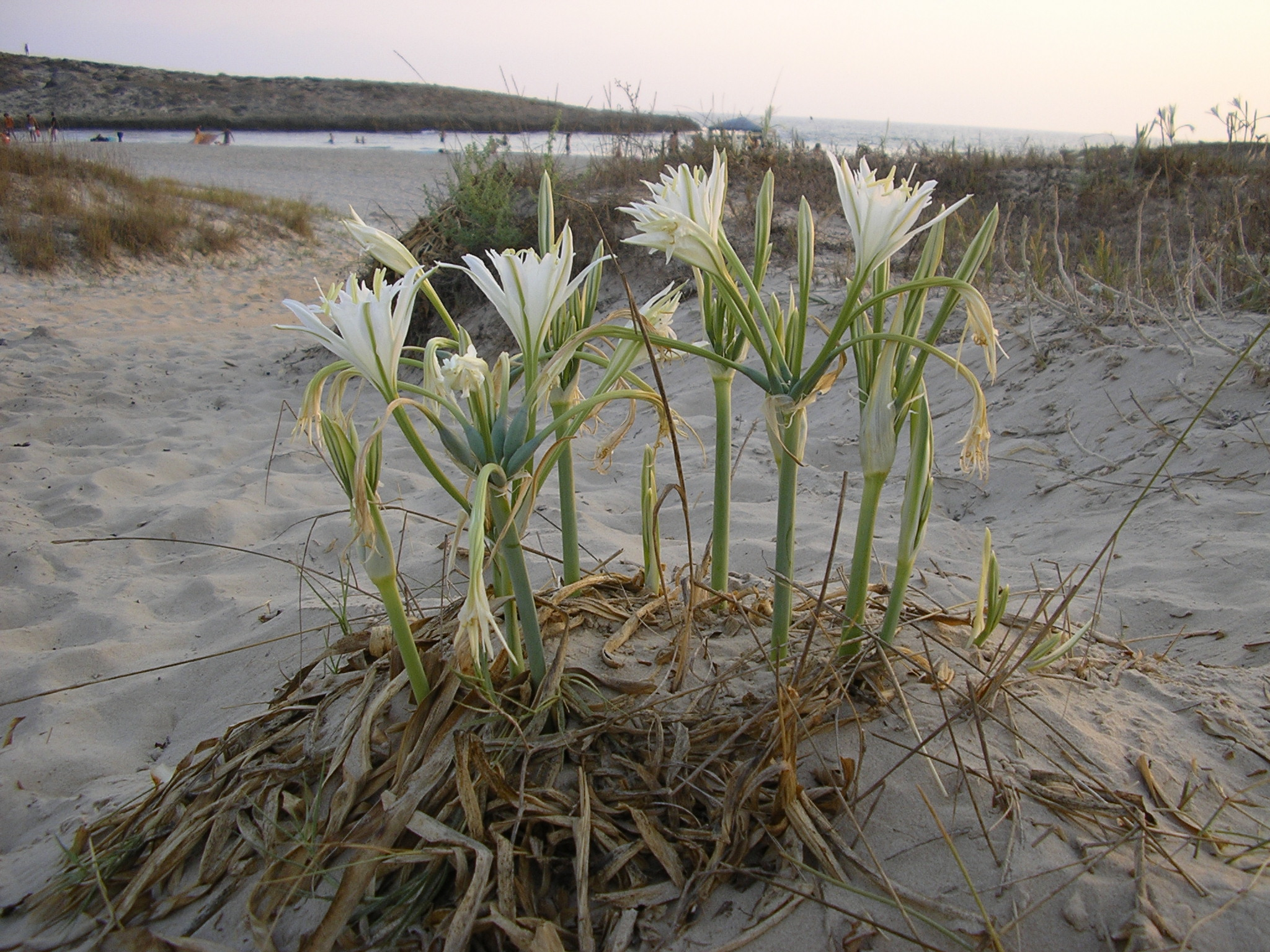
Pancratium maritimum

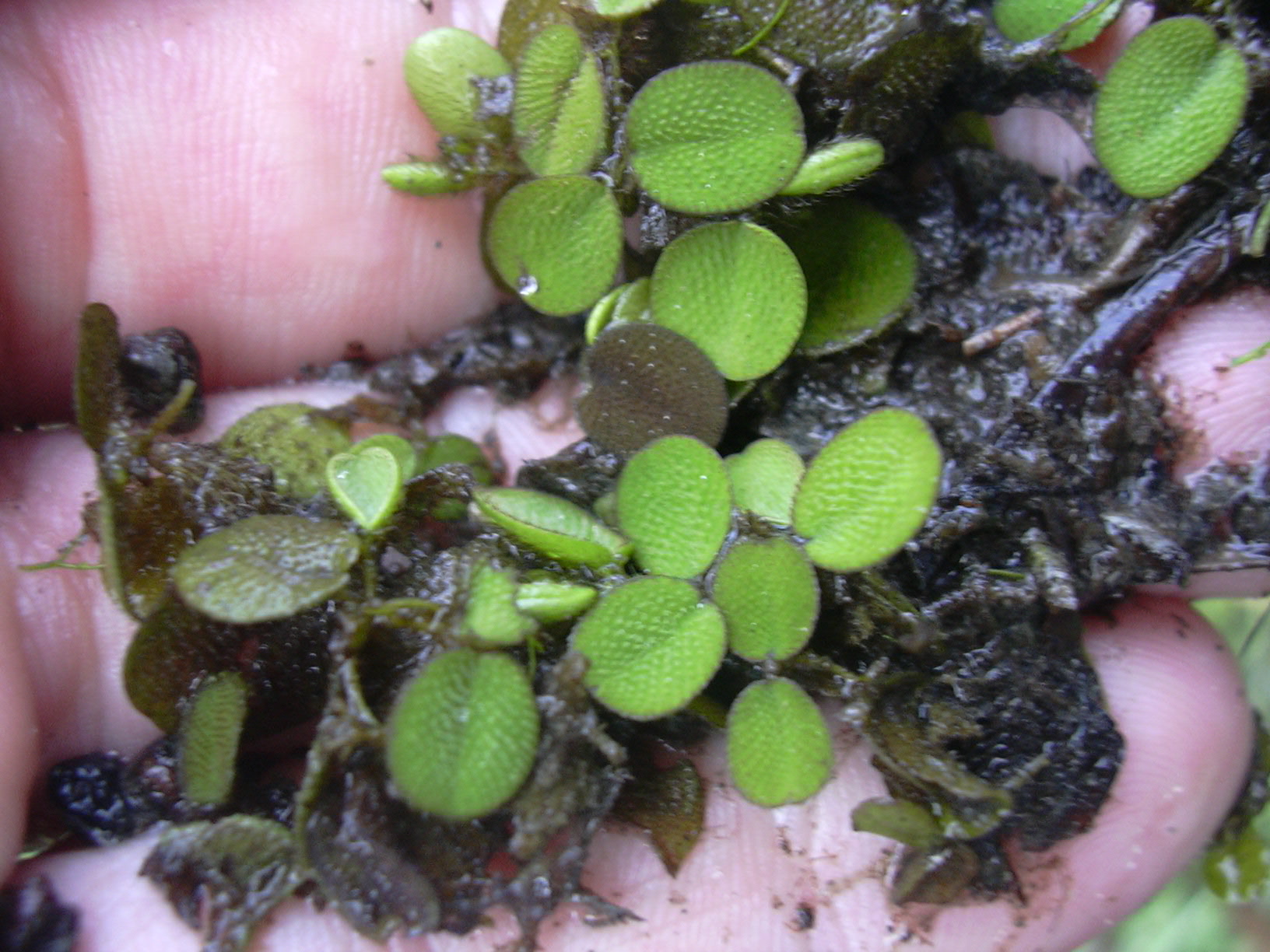
Salvinia minima

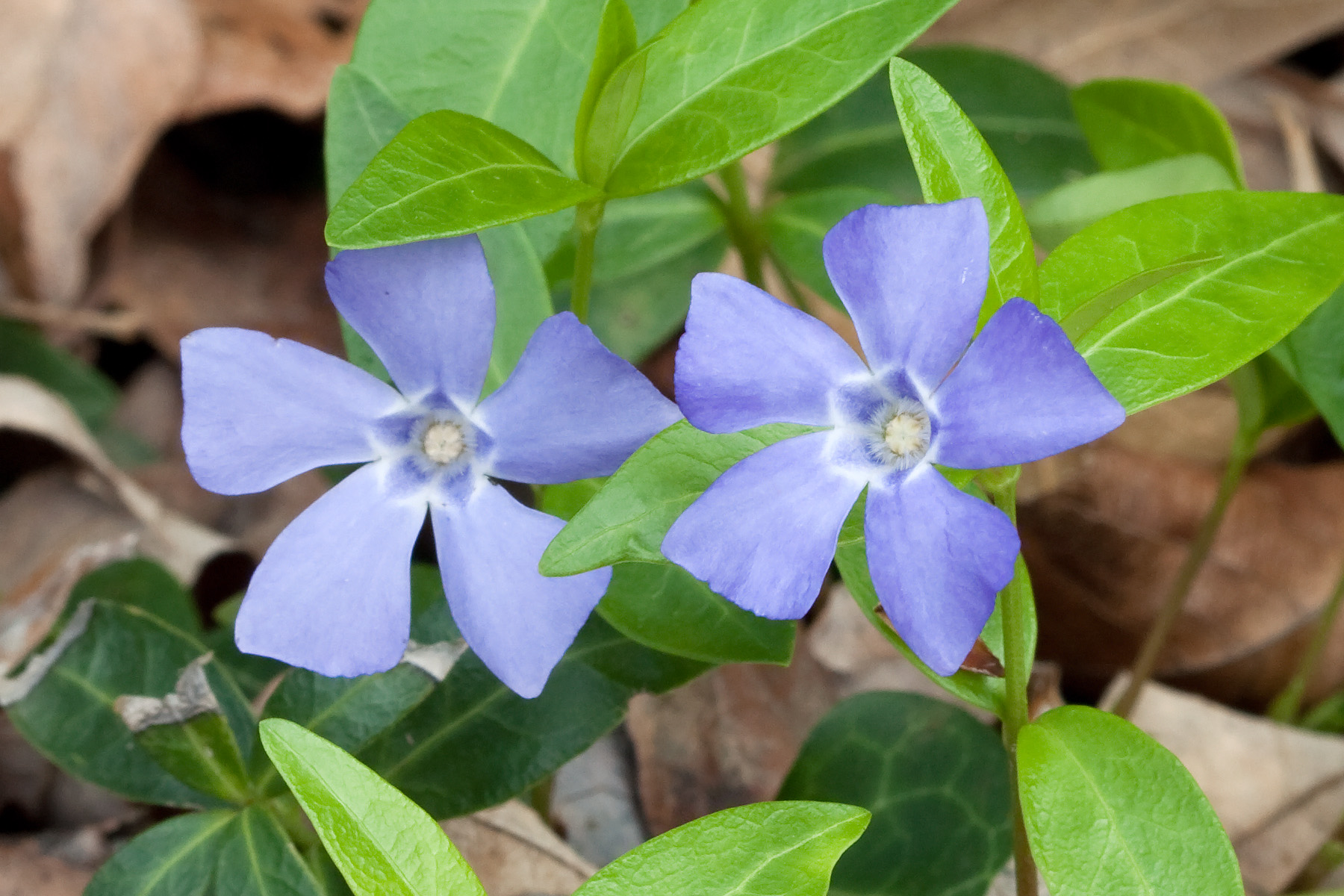
Vinca minor

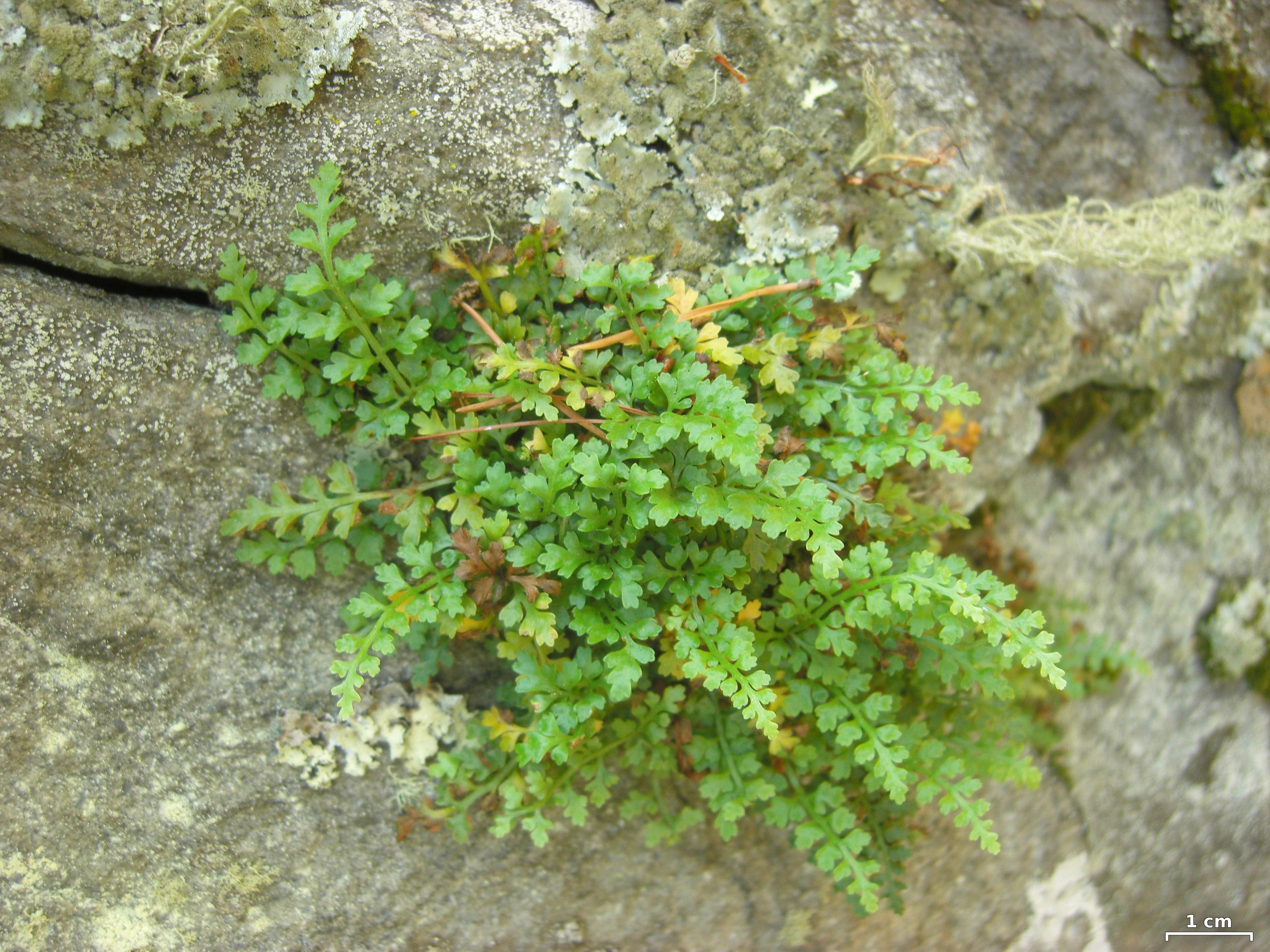
Asplenium montanum

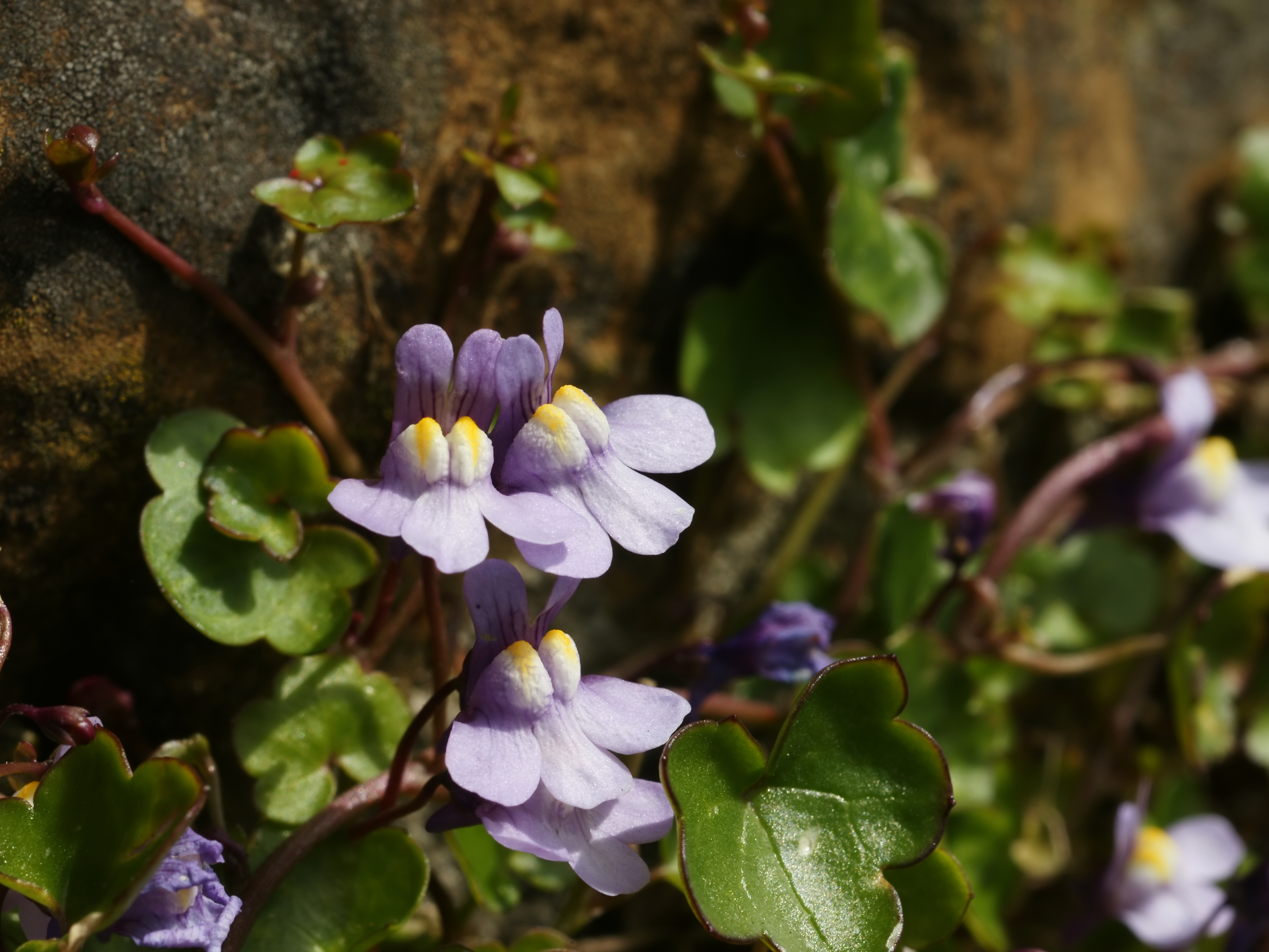
Cymbalaria muralis

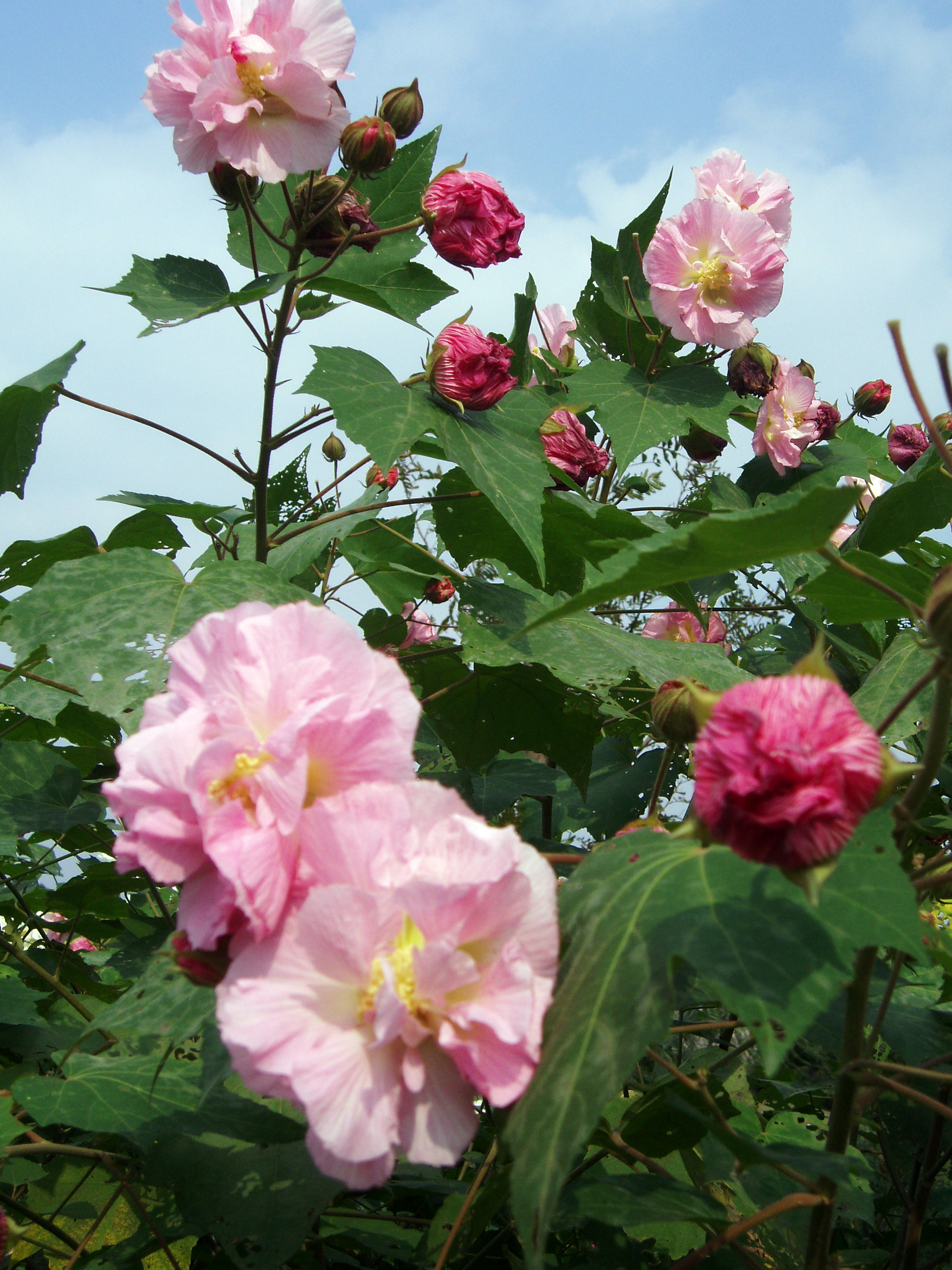
Hibiscus mutabilis

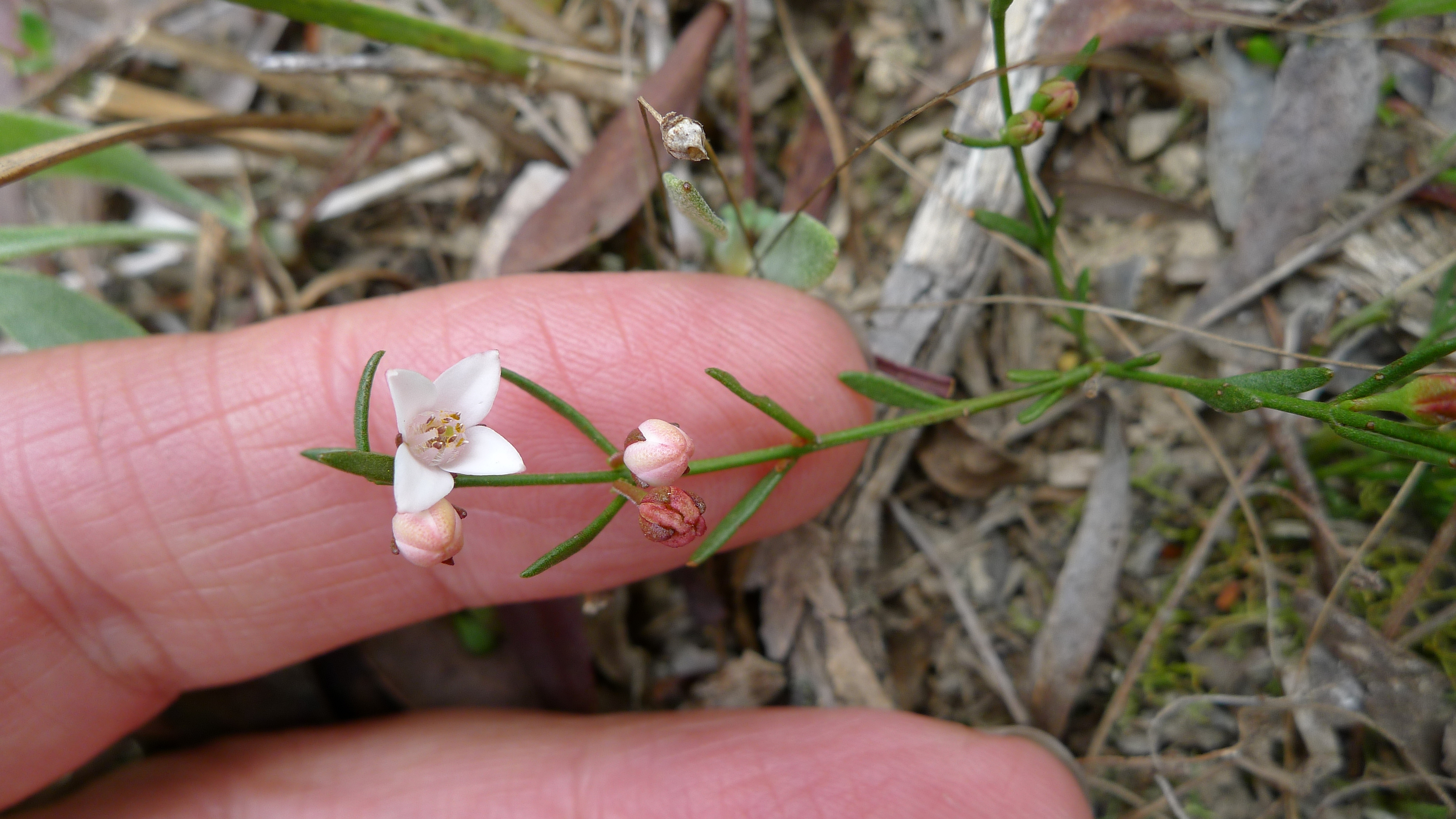
Boronia nana

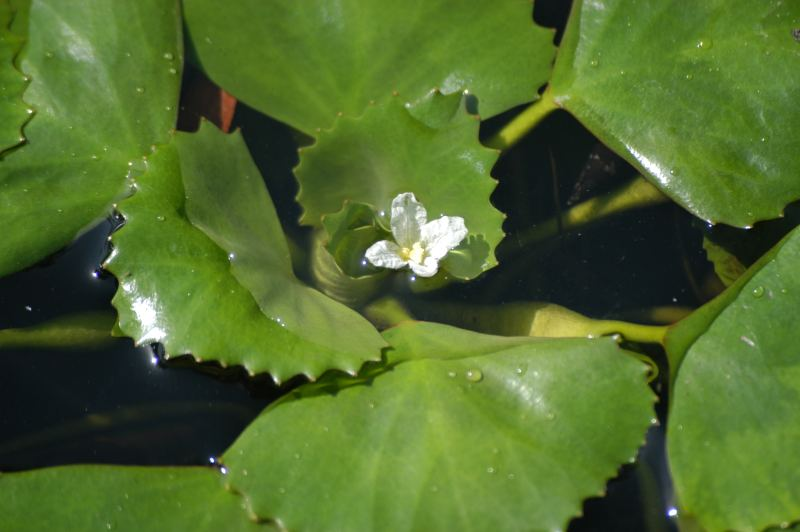
Trapa natans

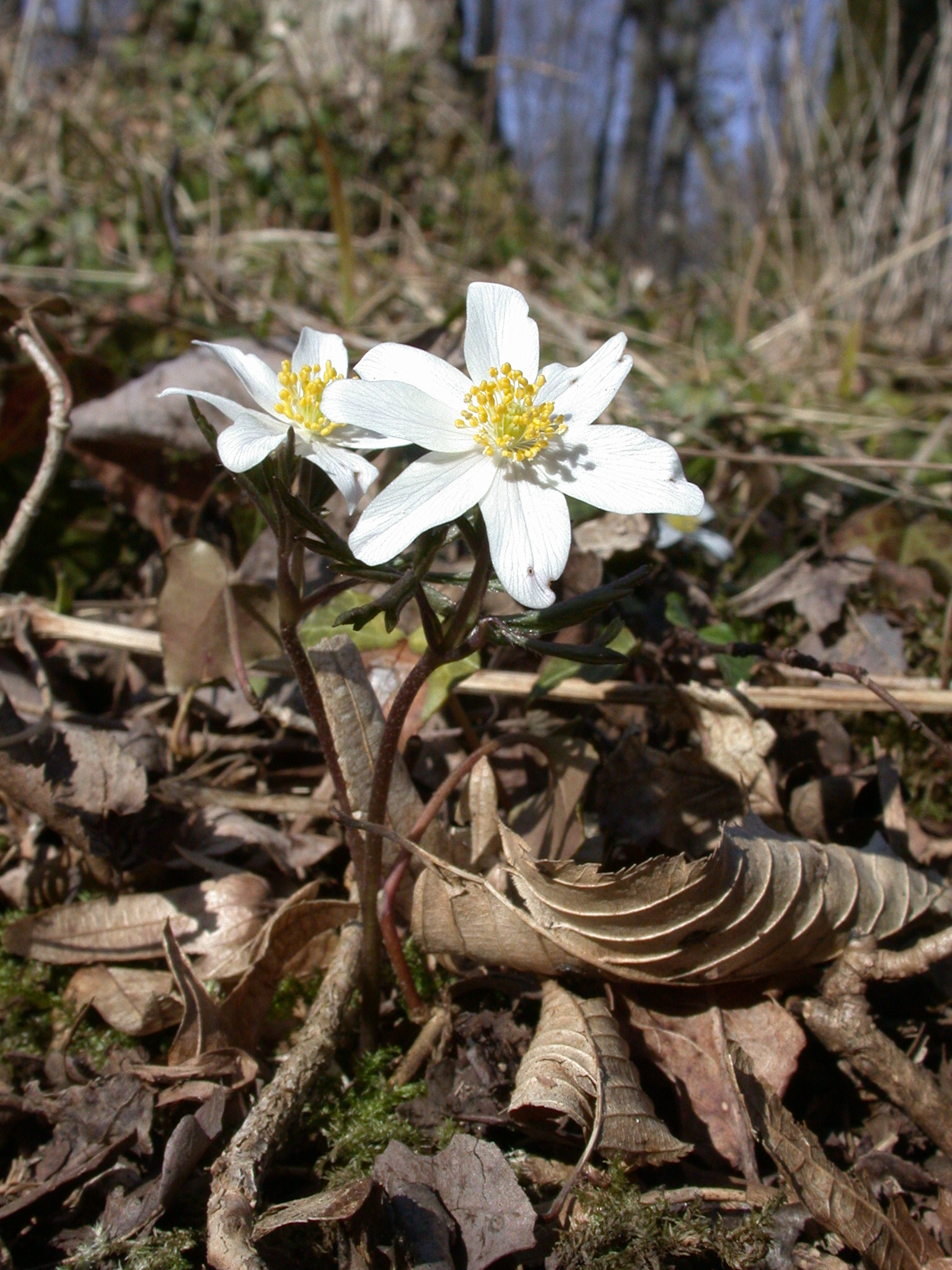
Anemonoides nemorosa

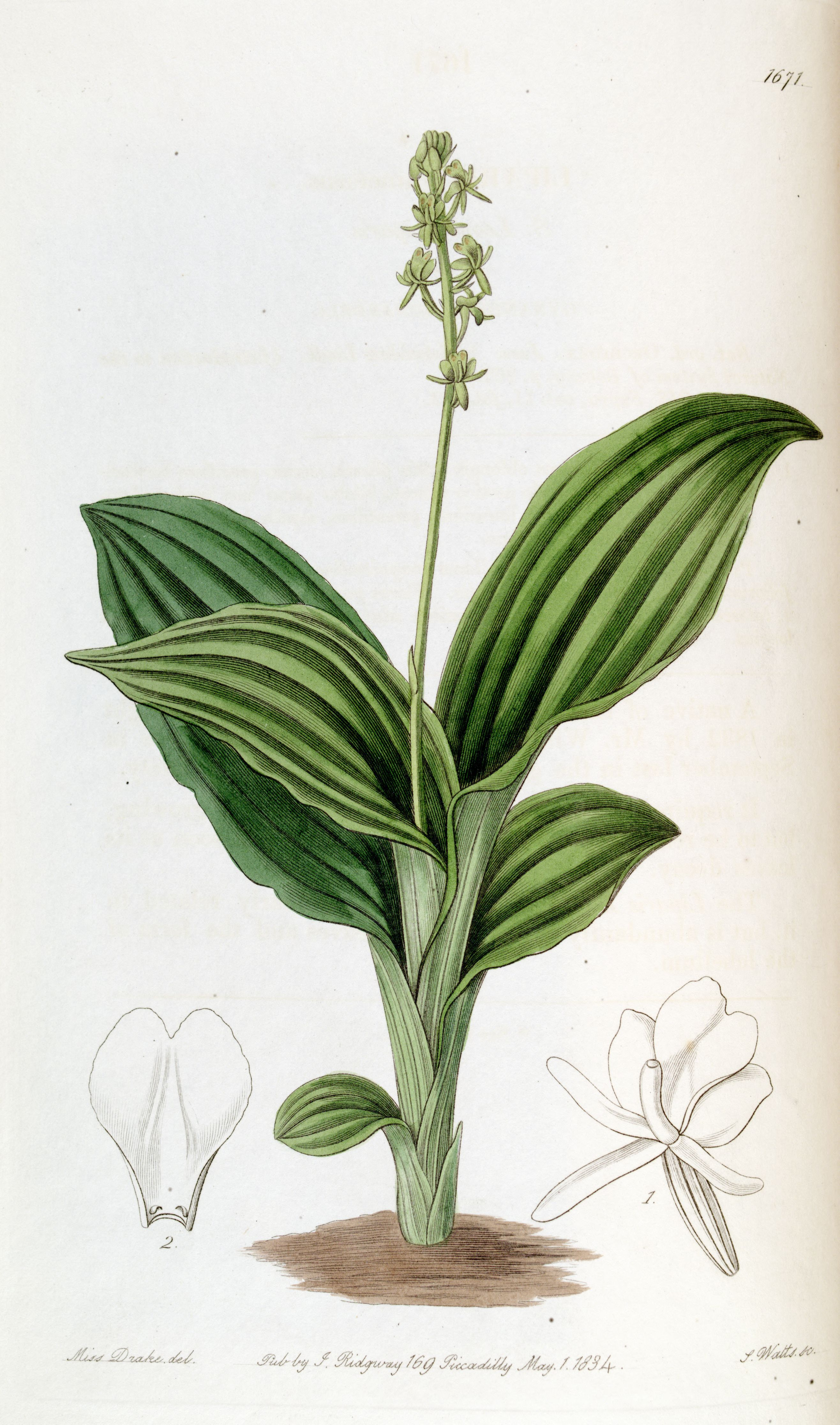
An illustration of Liparis nervosa

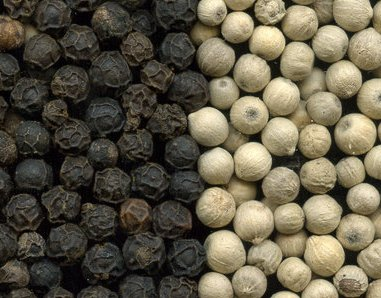
Dried peppercorns of black pepper (Piper nigrum)

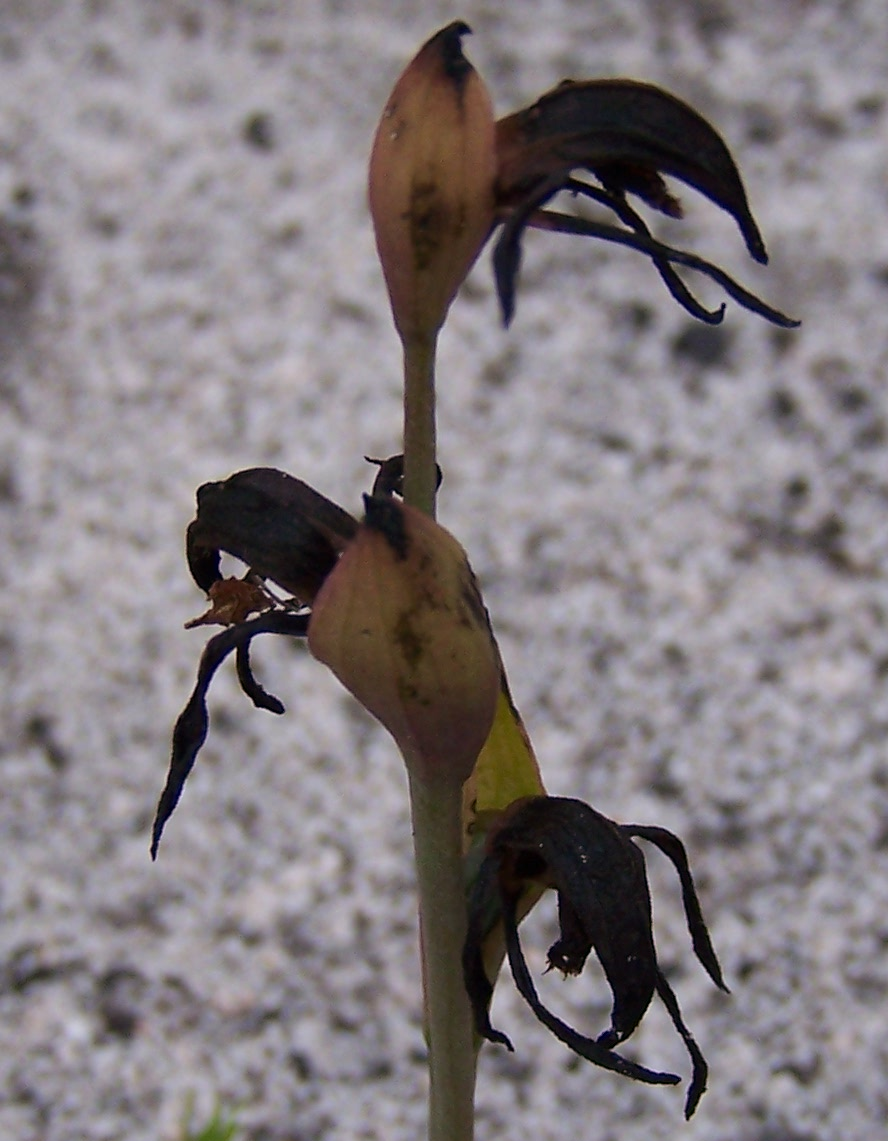
Pyrorchis nigricans

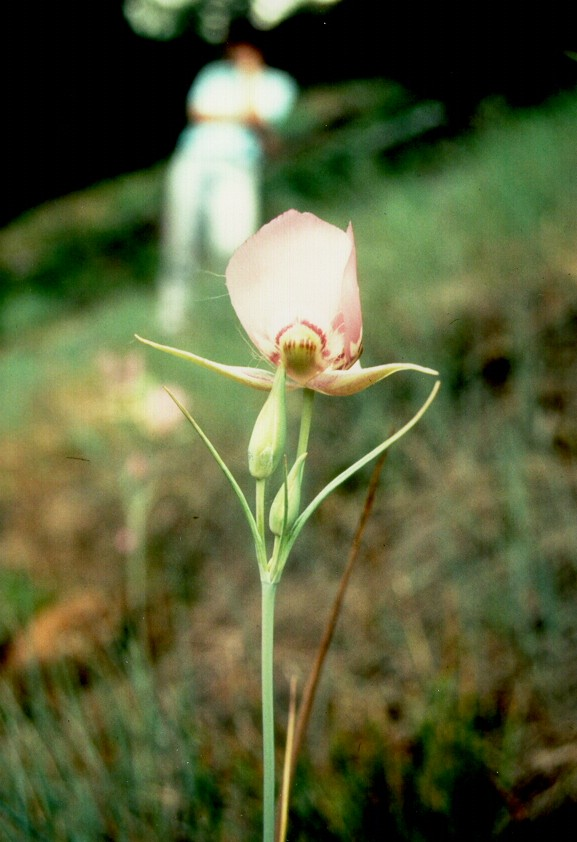
Calochortus nitidus

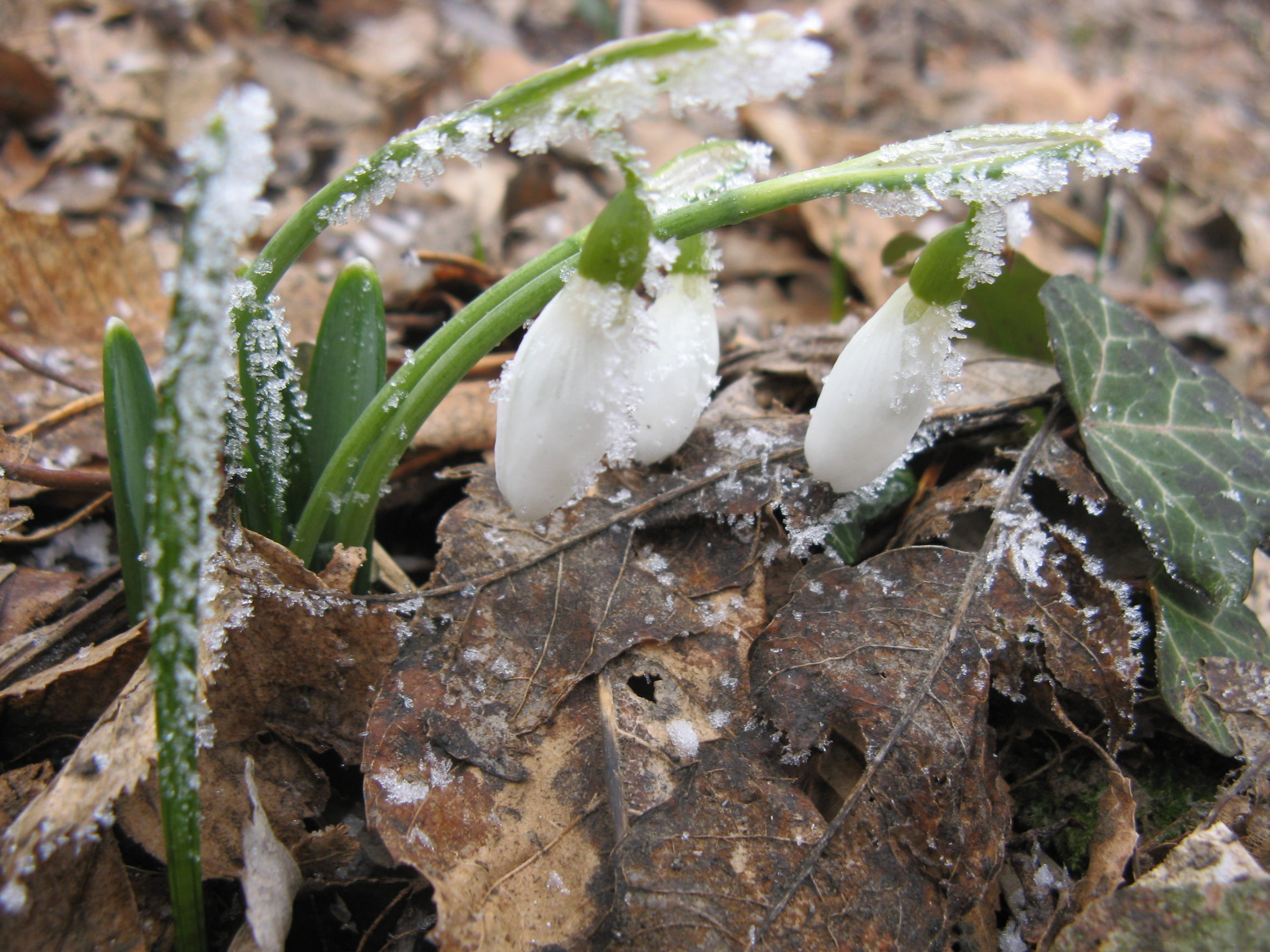
Galanthus nivalis

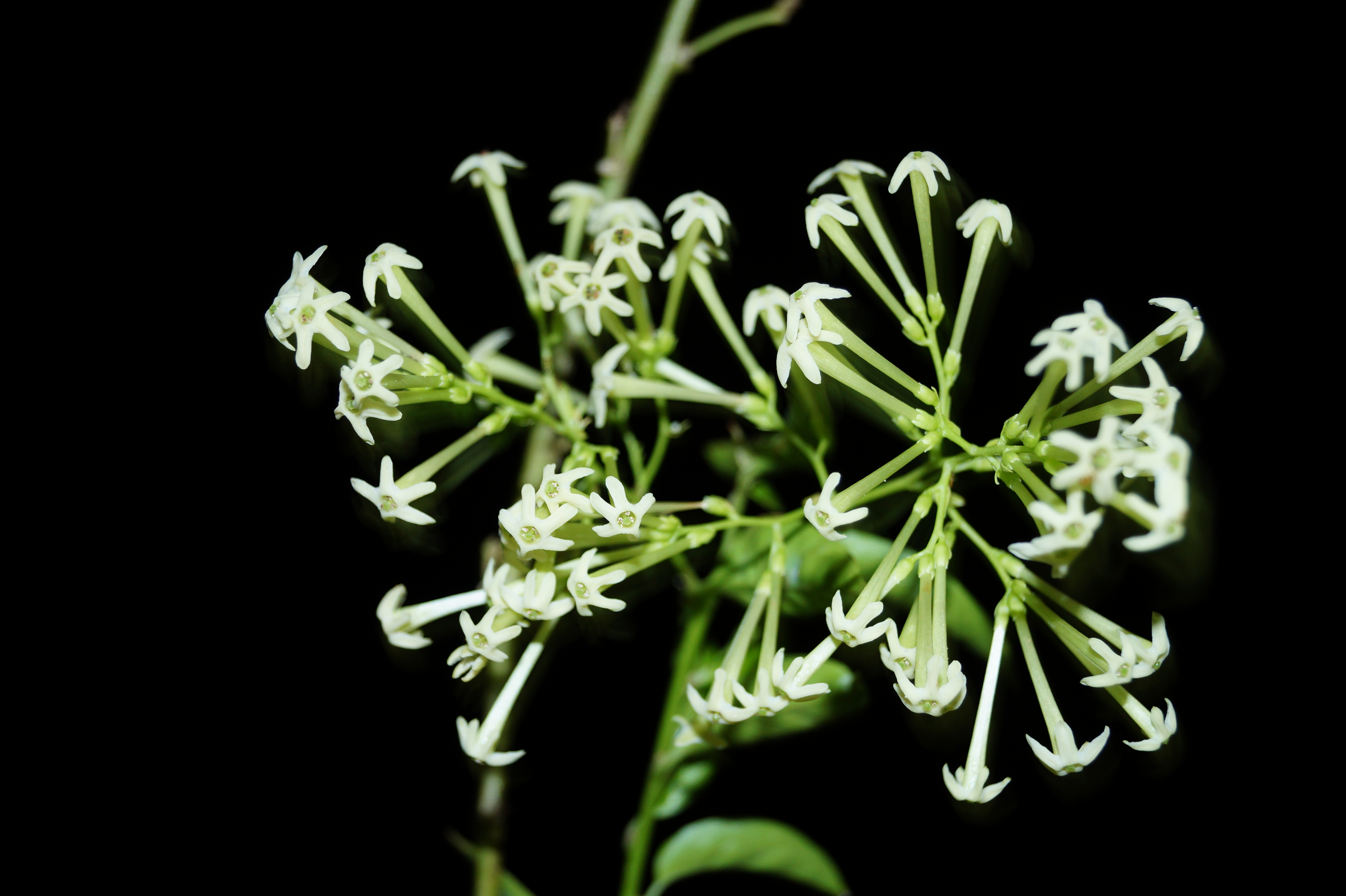
Cestrum nocturnum

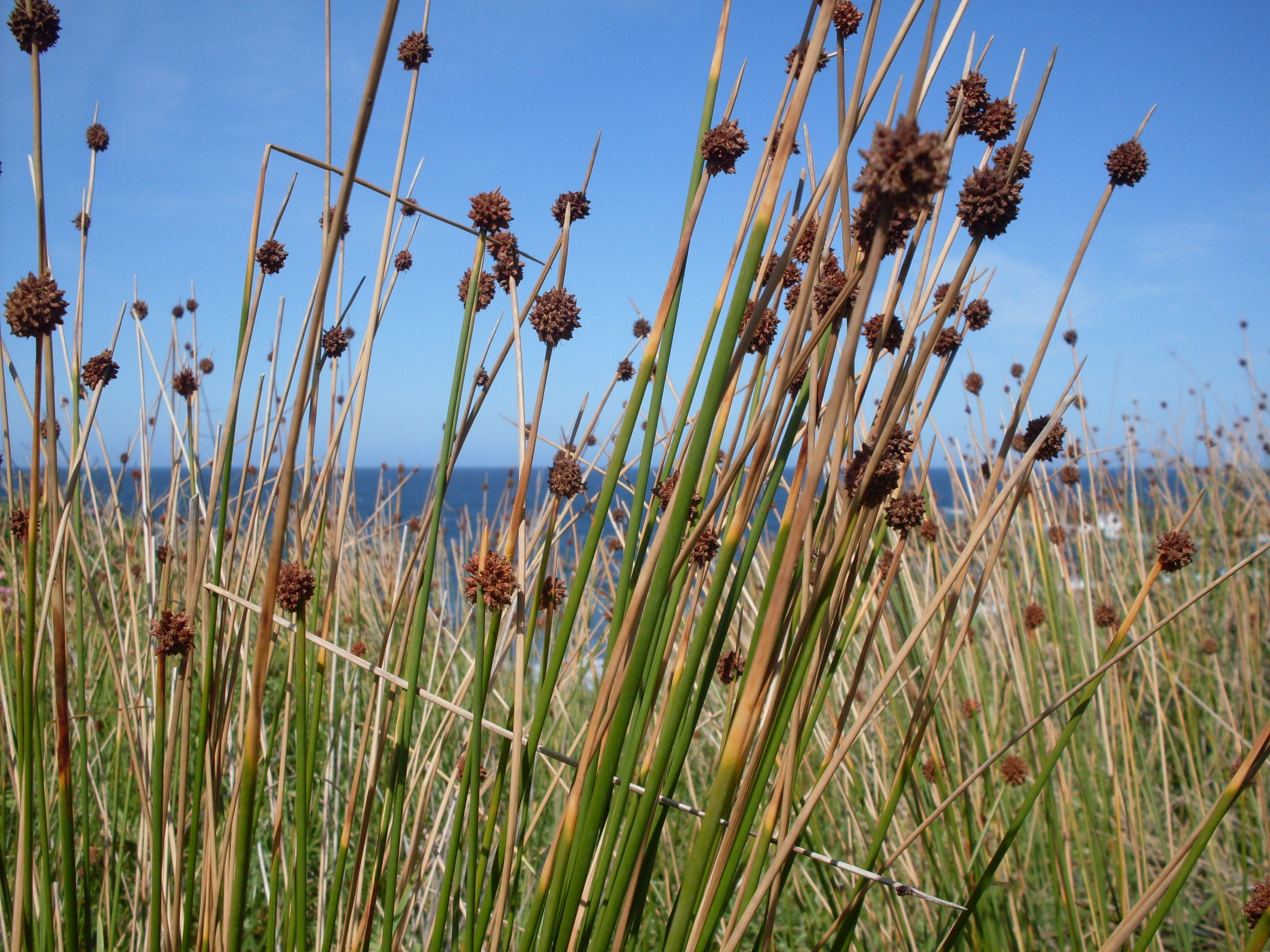
Ficinia nodosa

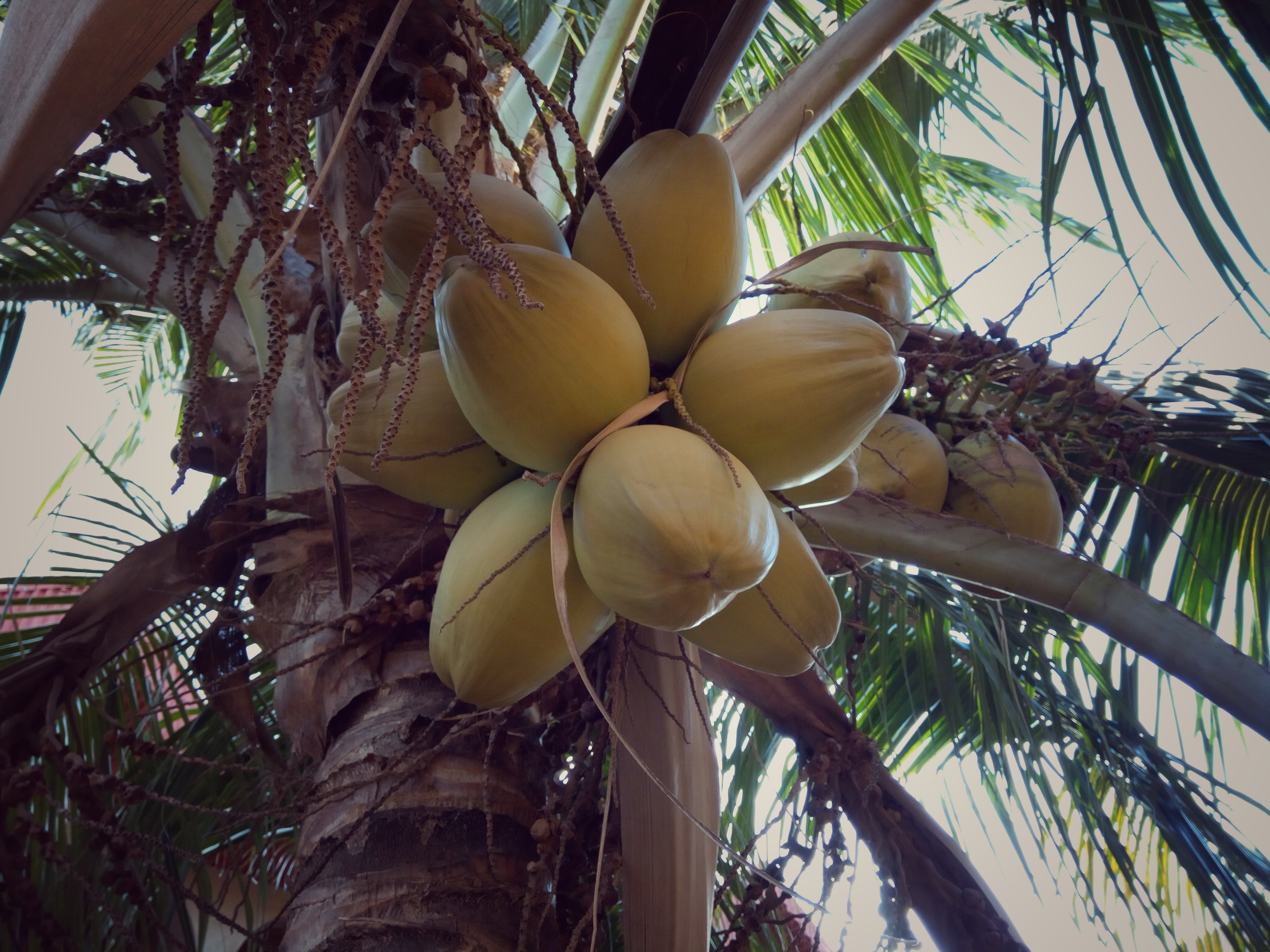
Coconut (Cocos nucifera)

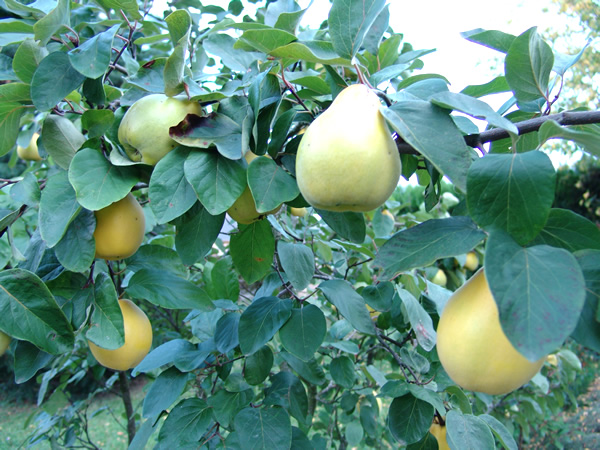
Quince (Cydonia oblonga)

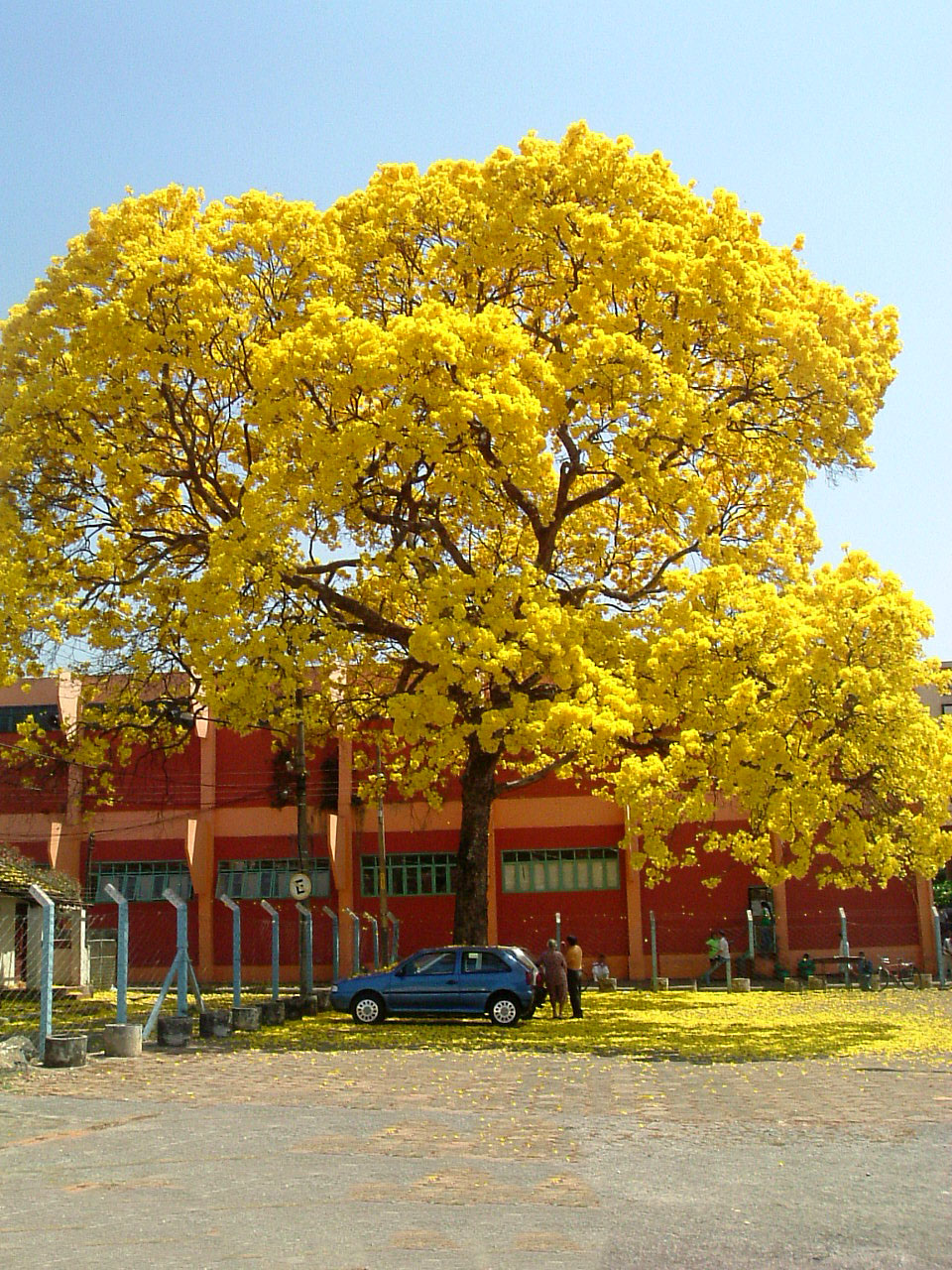
Tabebuia ochracea

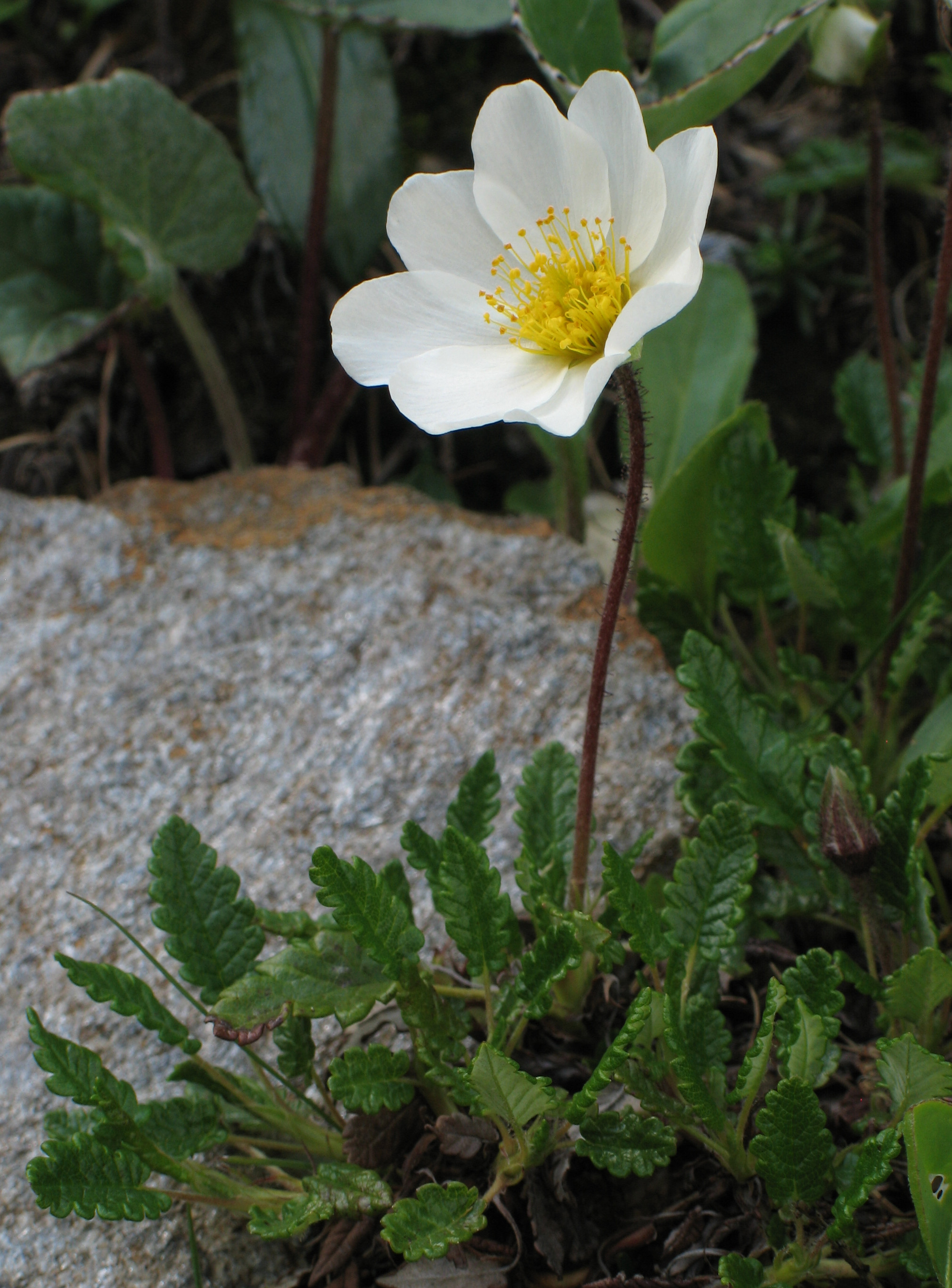
Dryas octopetala

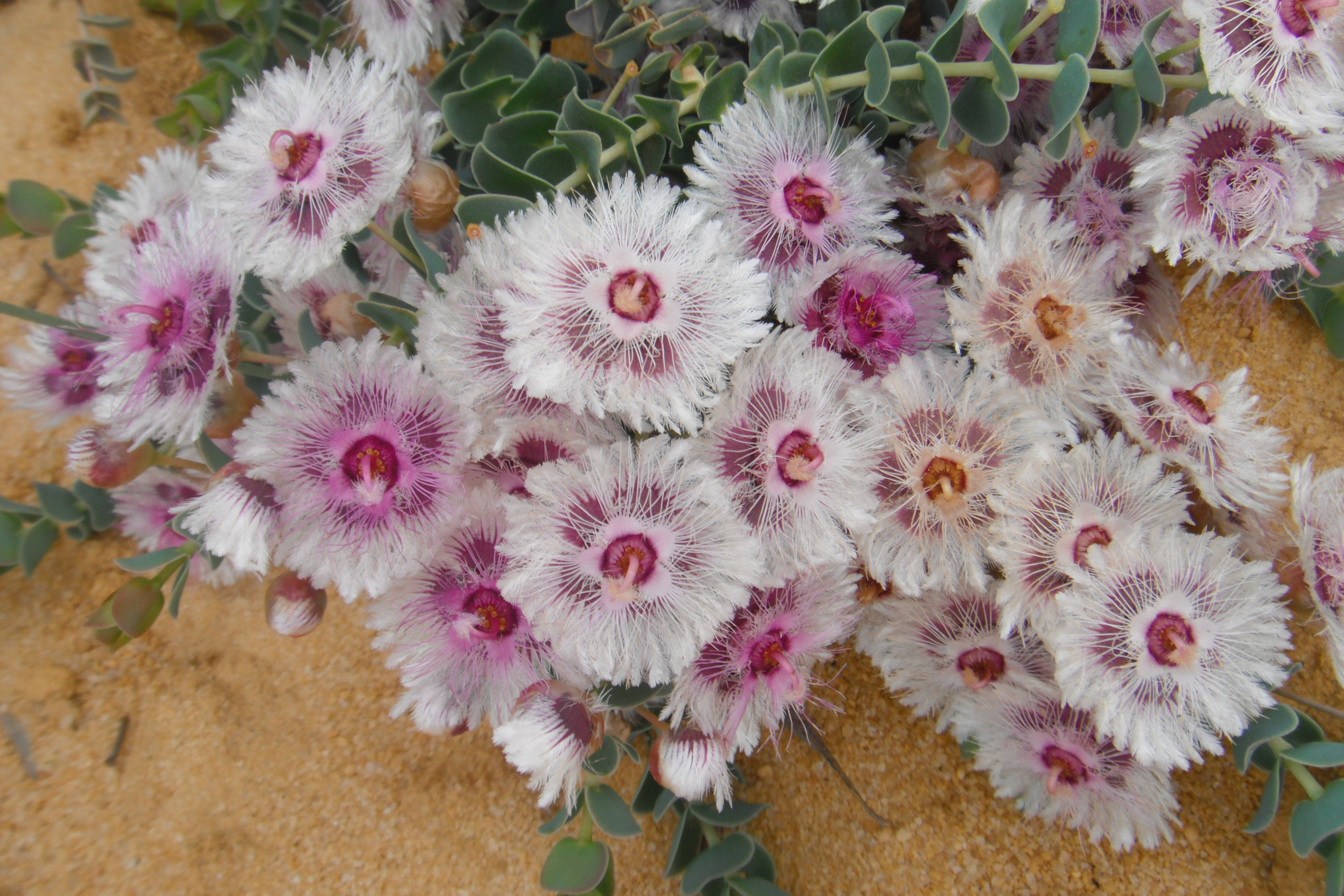
Verticordia oculata

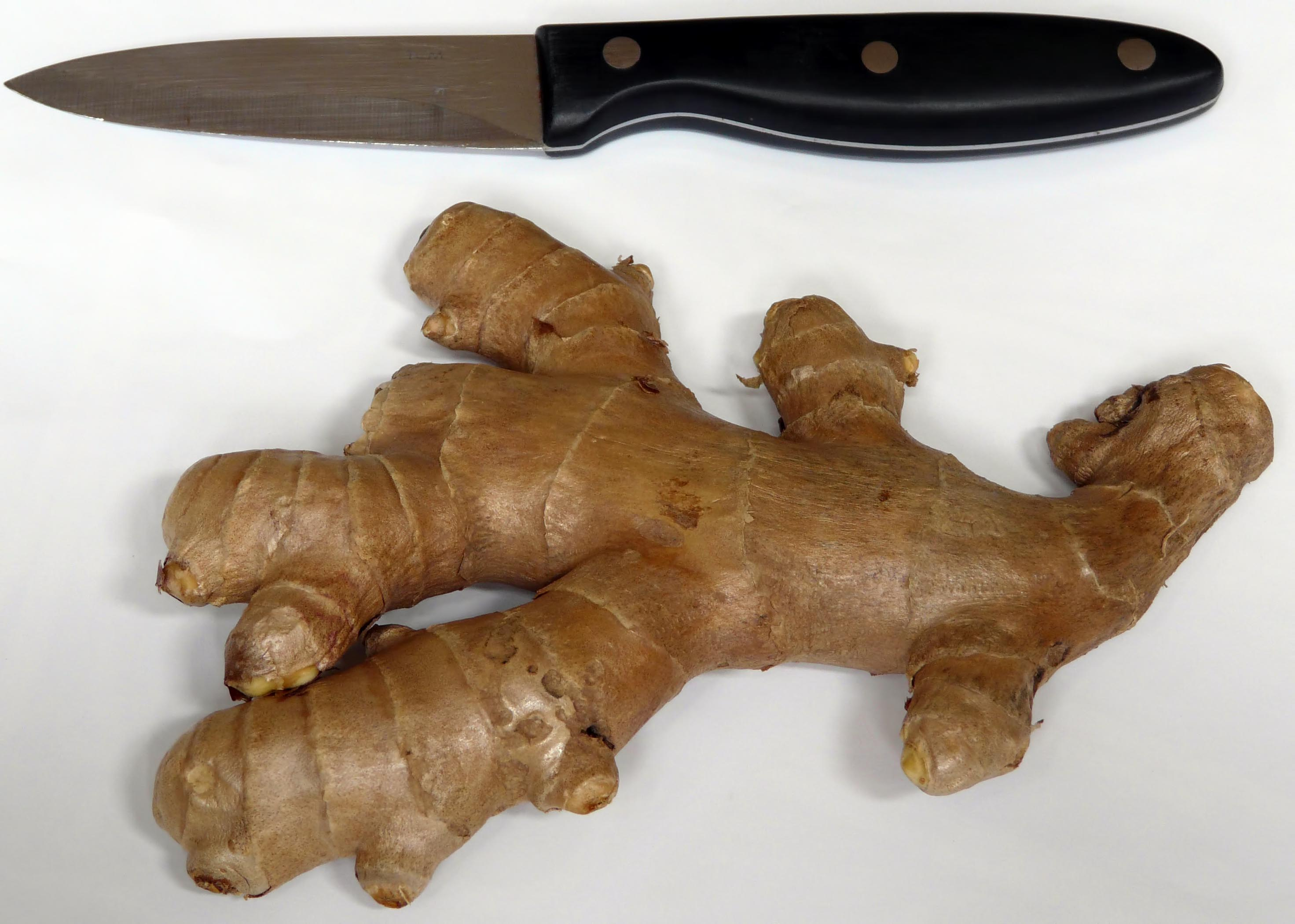
Ginger root (Zingiber officinale)

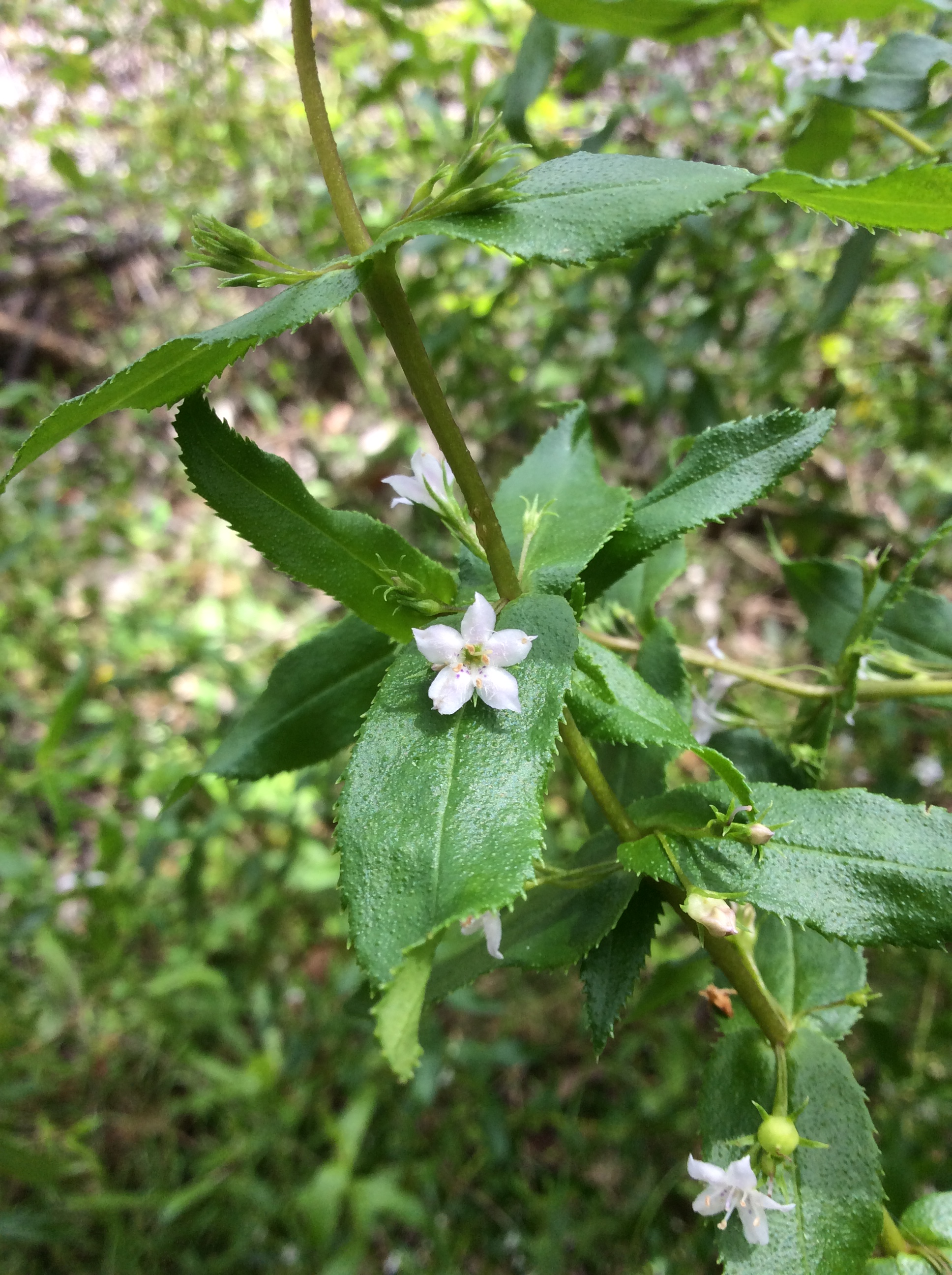
Myoporum oppositifolium

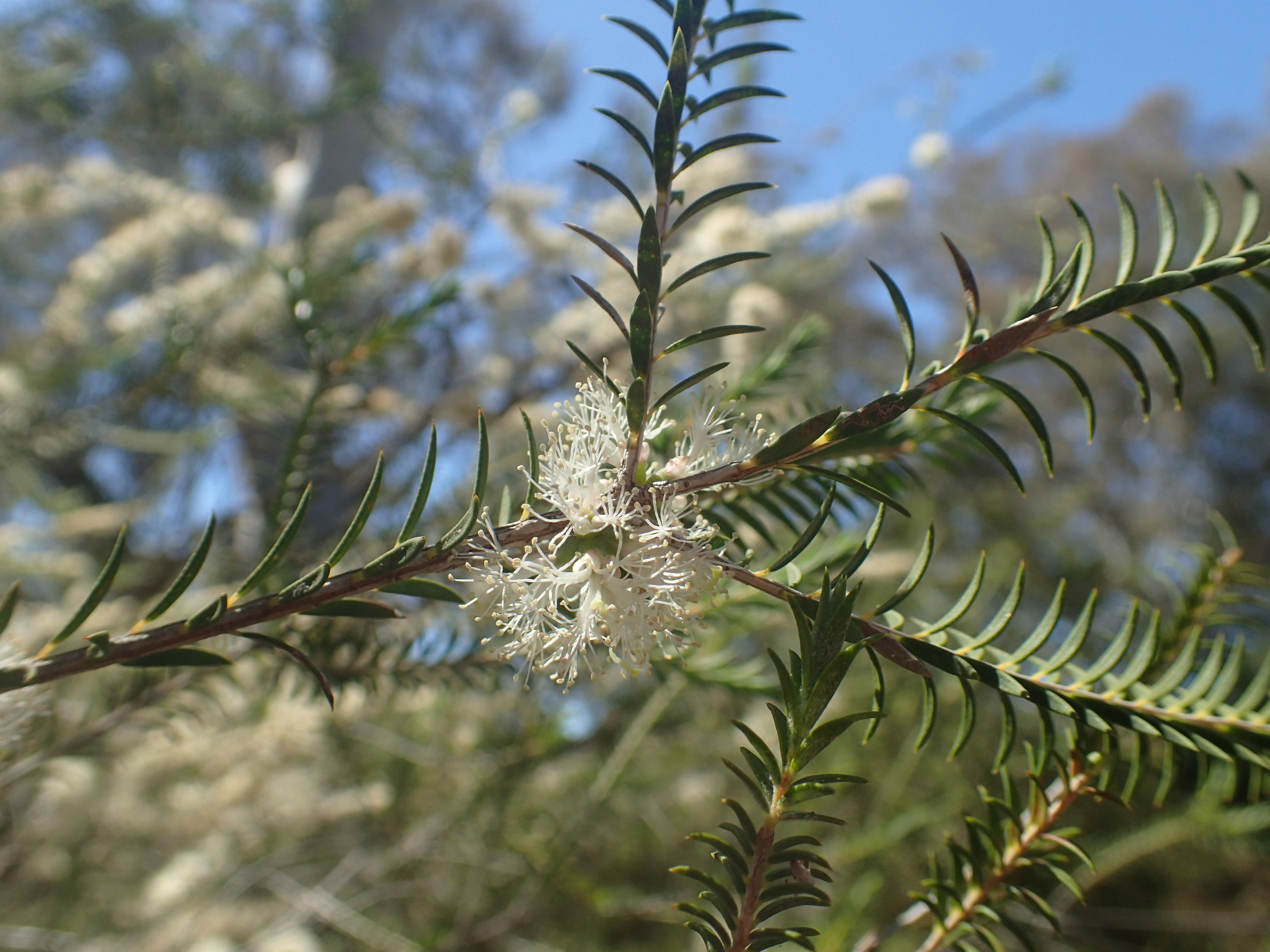
Melaleuca oxyphylla

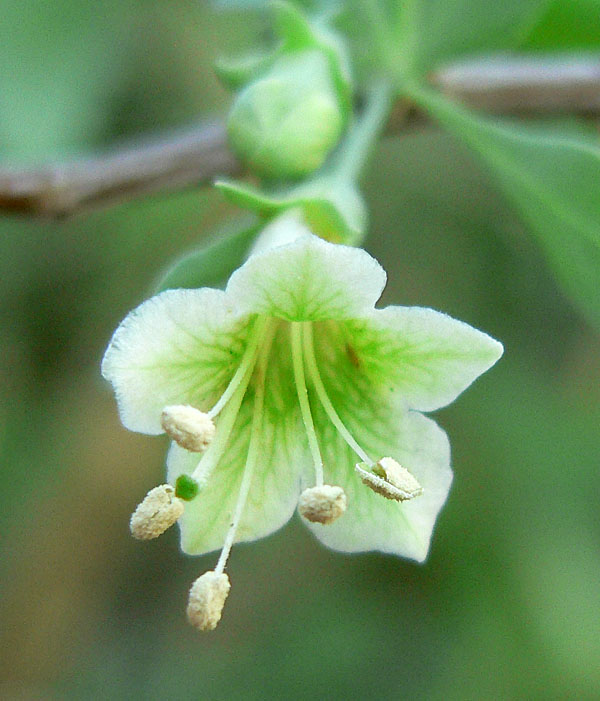
Lycium pallidum

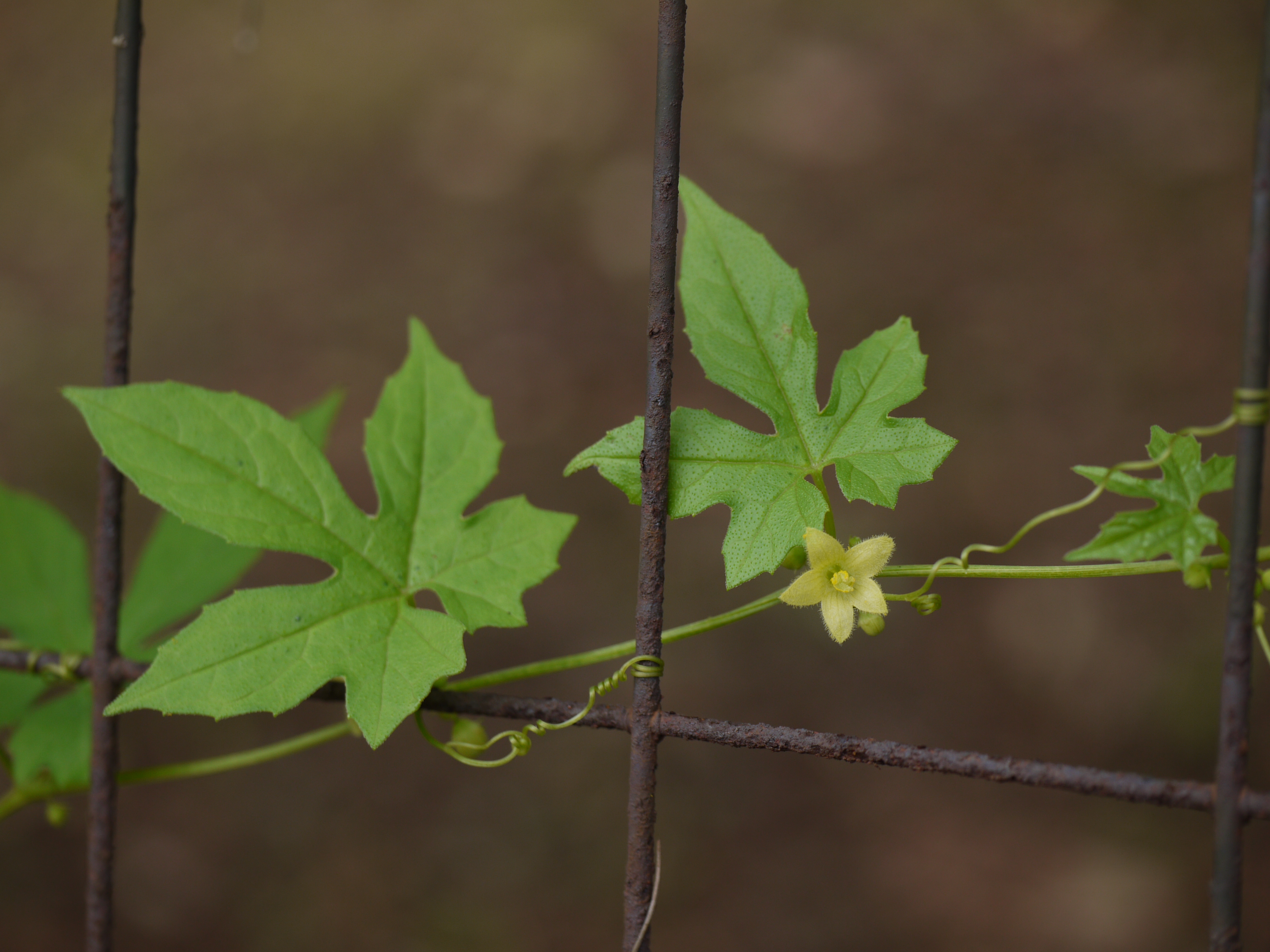
Diplocyclos palmatus

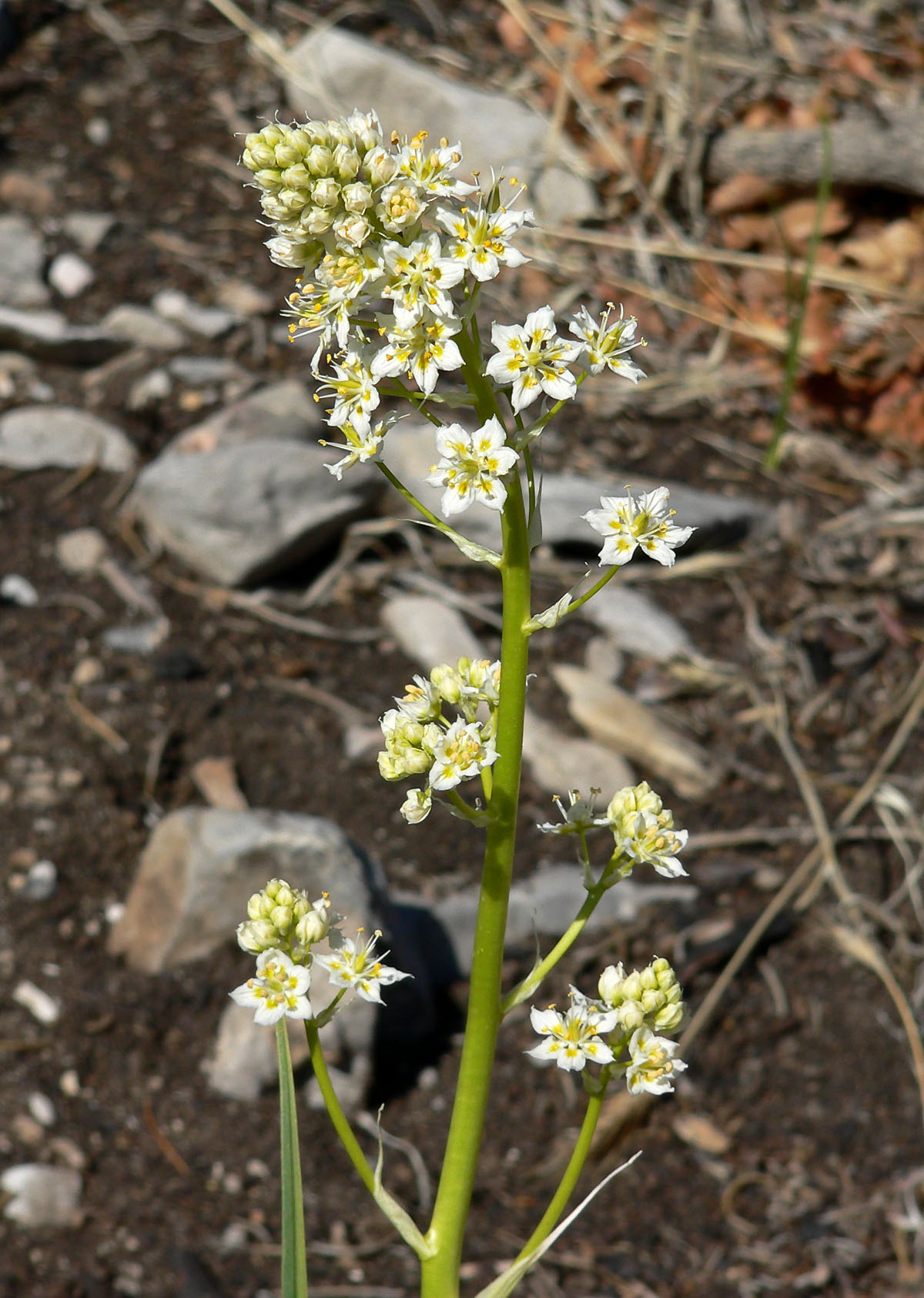
Toxicoscordion paniculatum

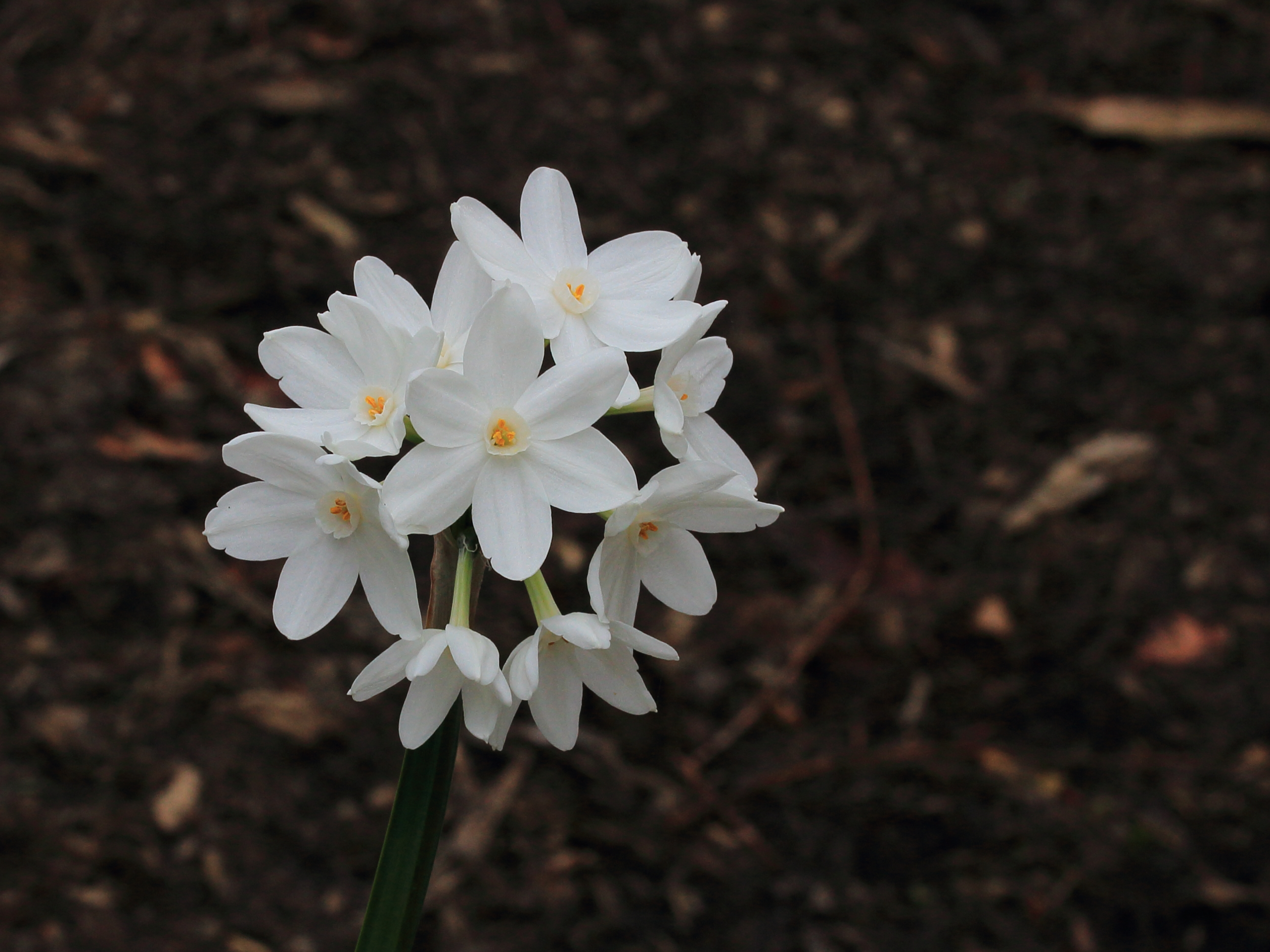
Narcissus papyraceus

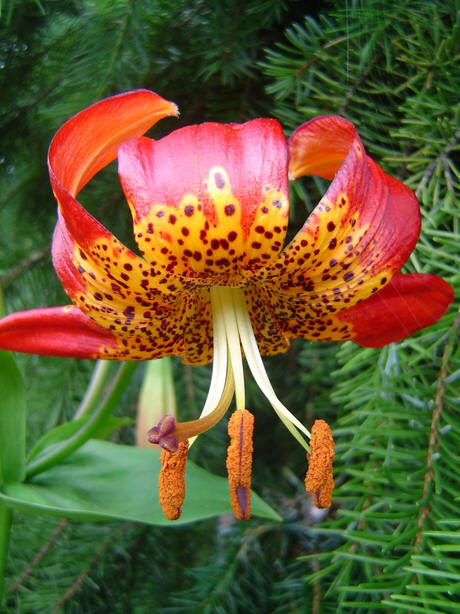
Lilium pardalinum

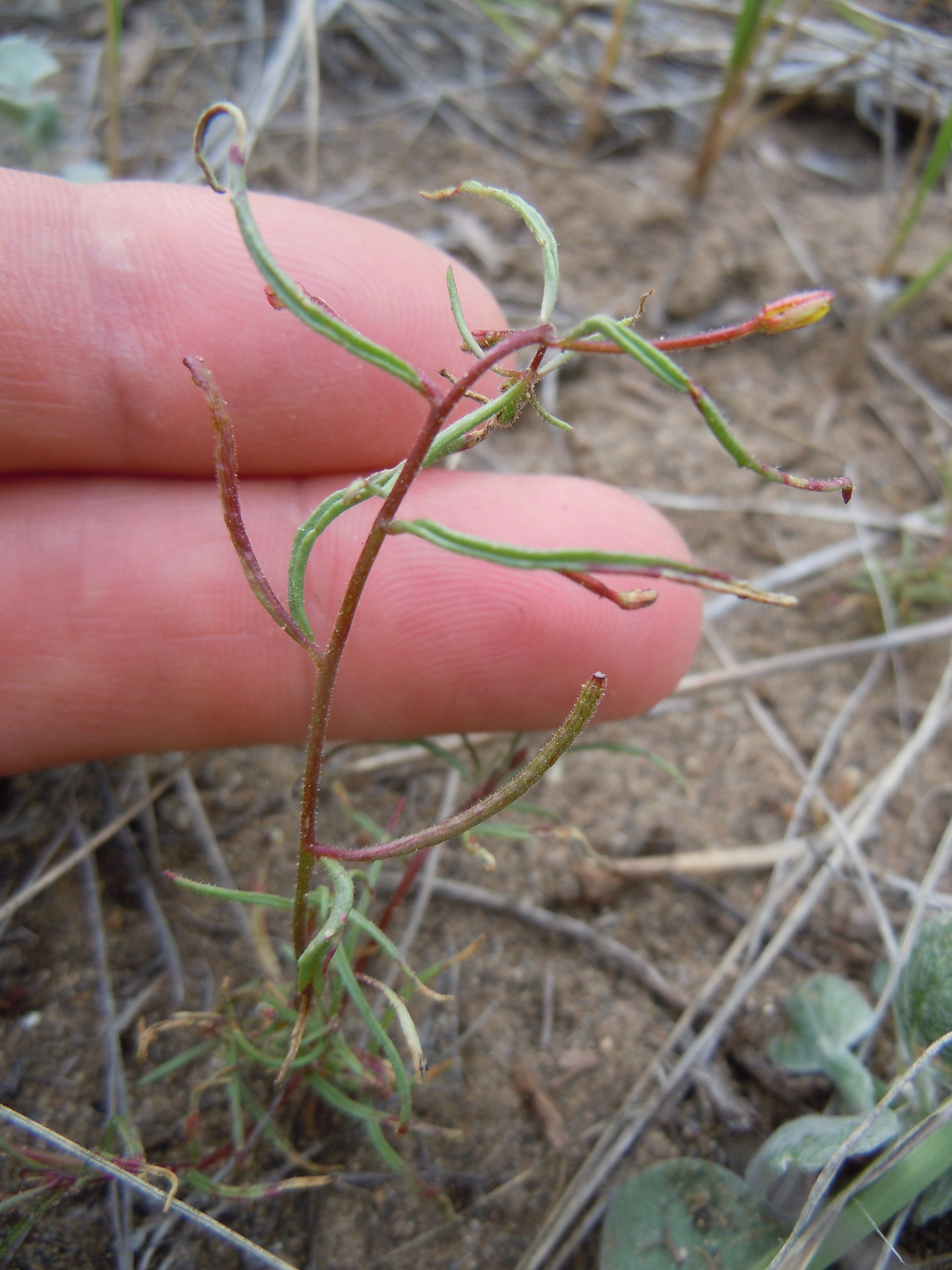
Camissonia parvula

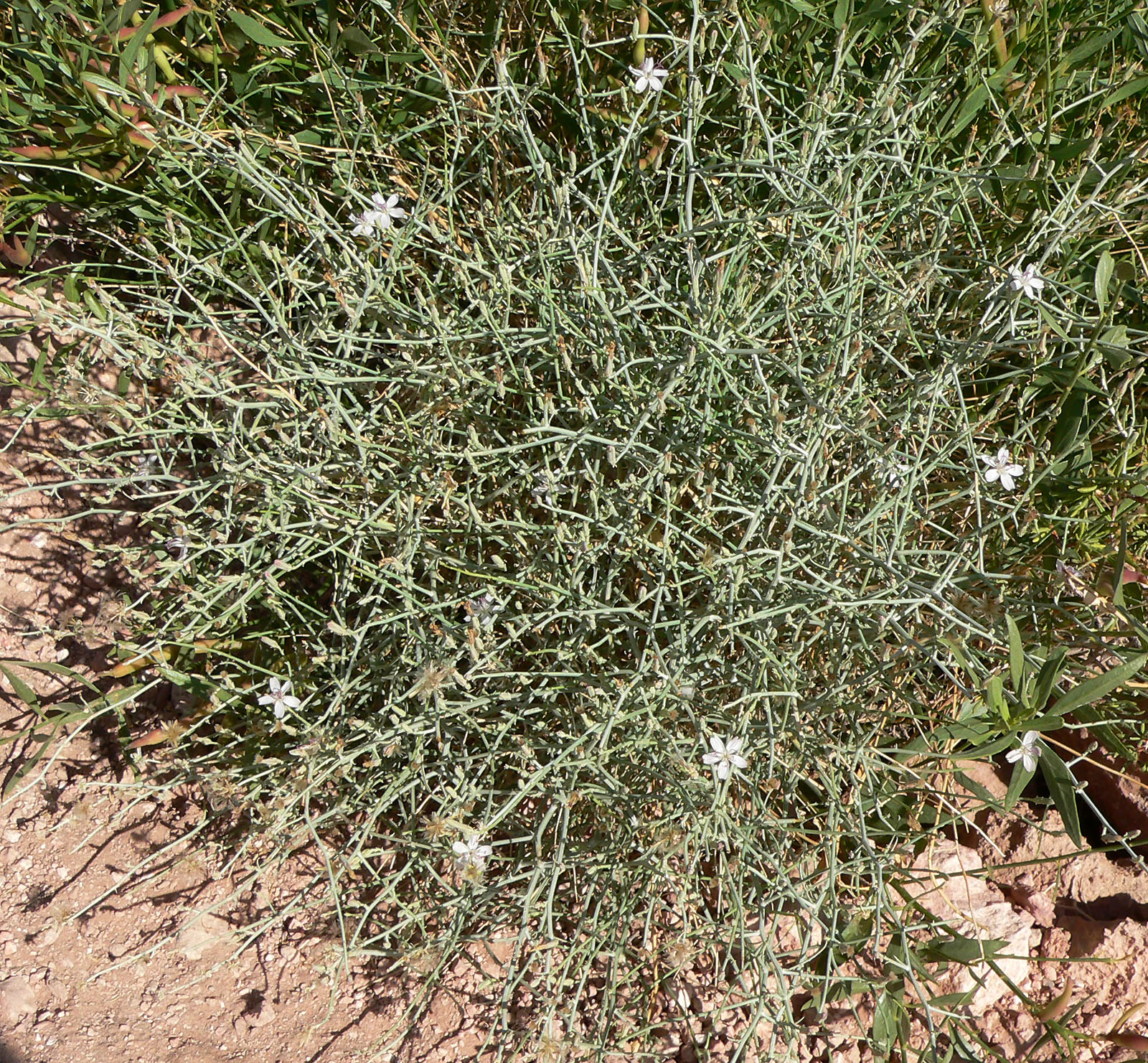
Stephanomeria pauciflora

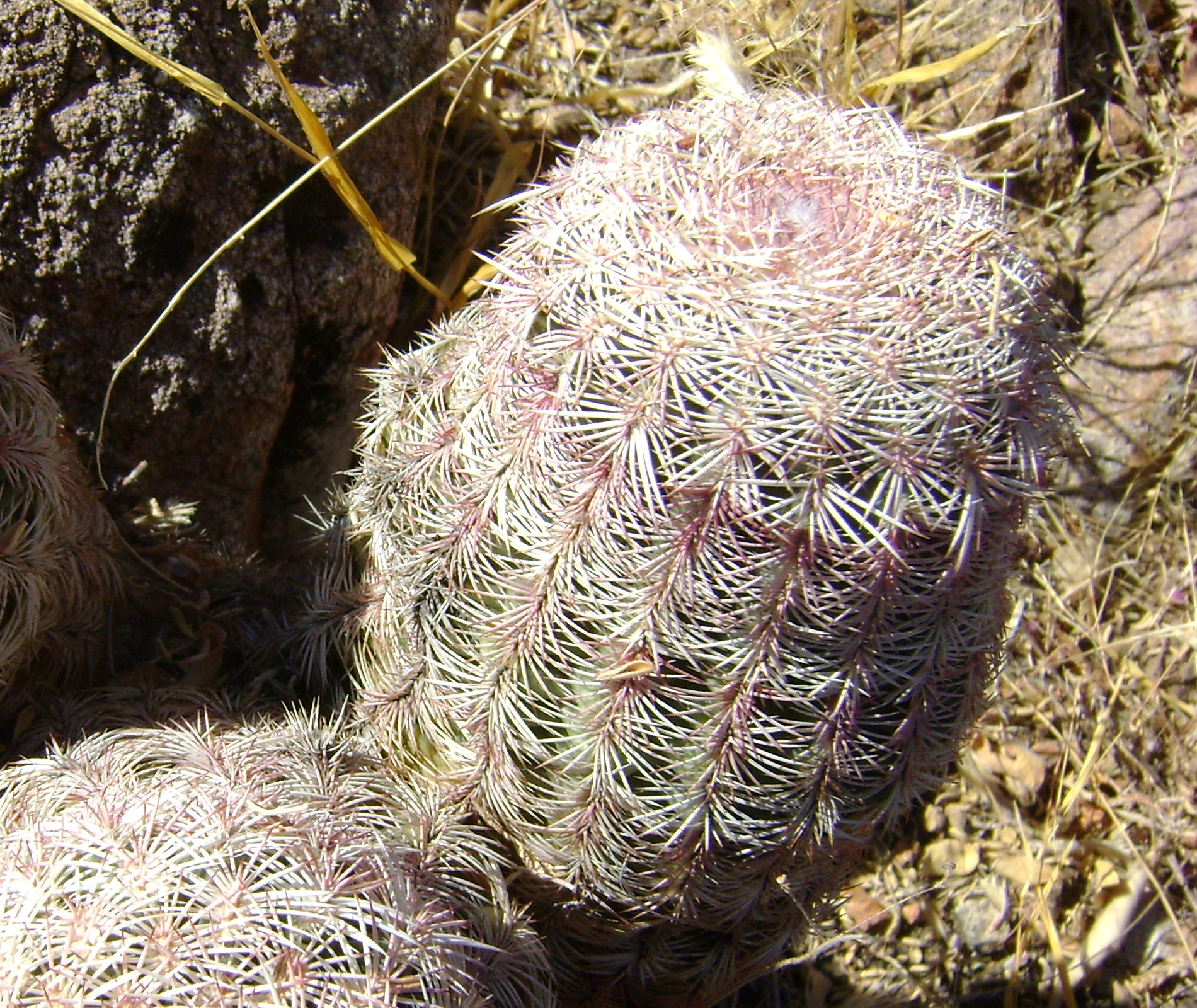
Echinocereus pectinatus

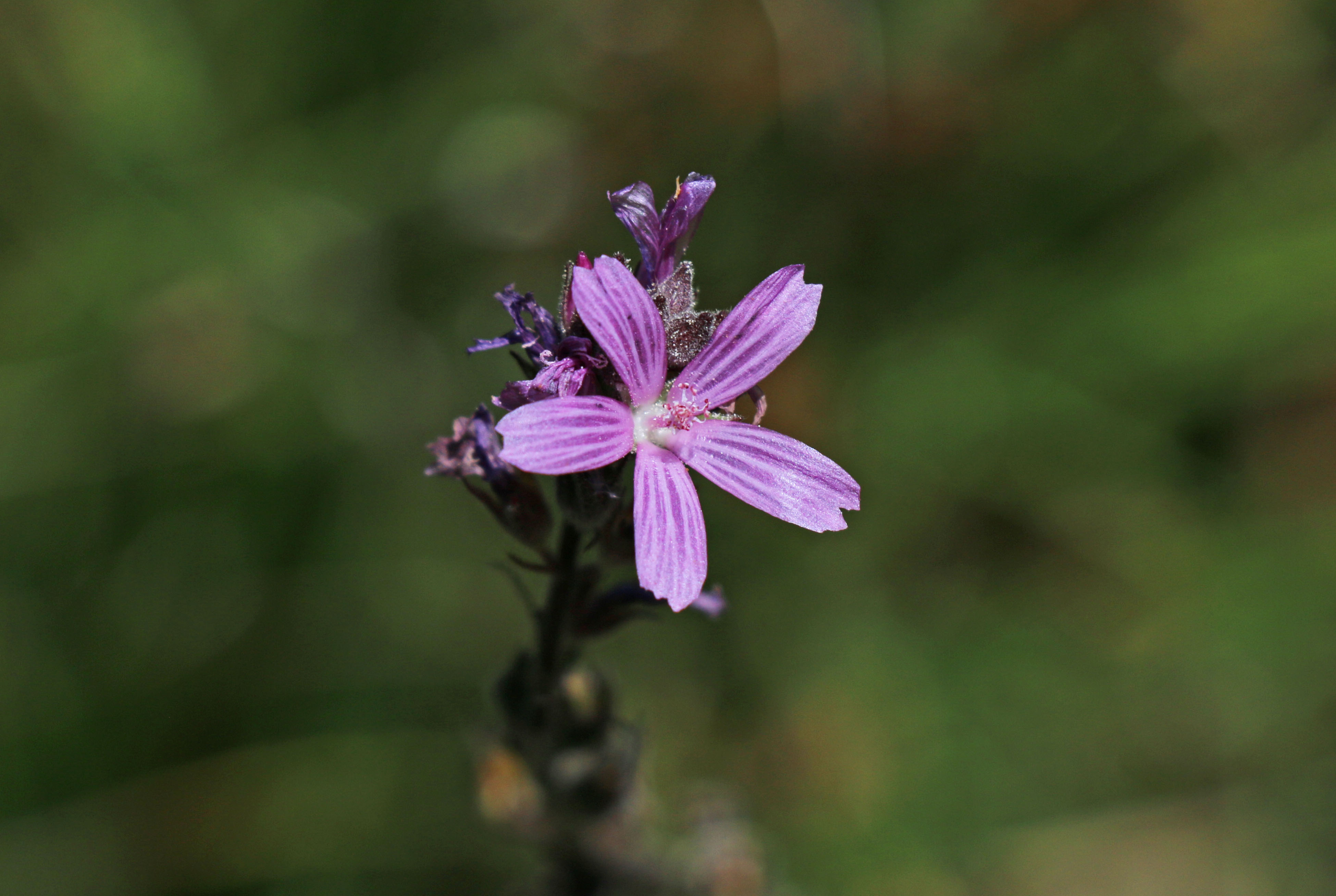
Sidalcea pedata

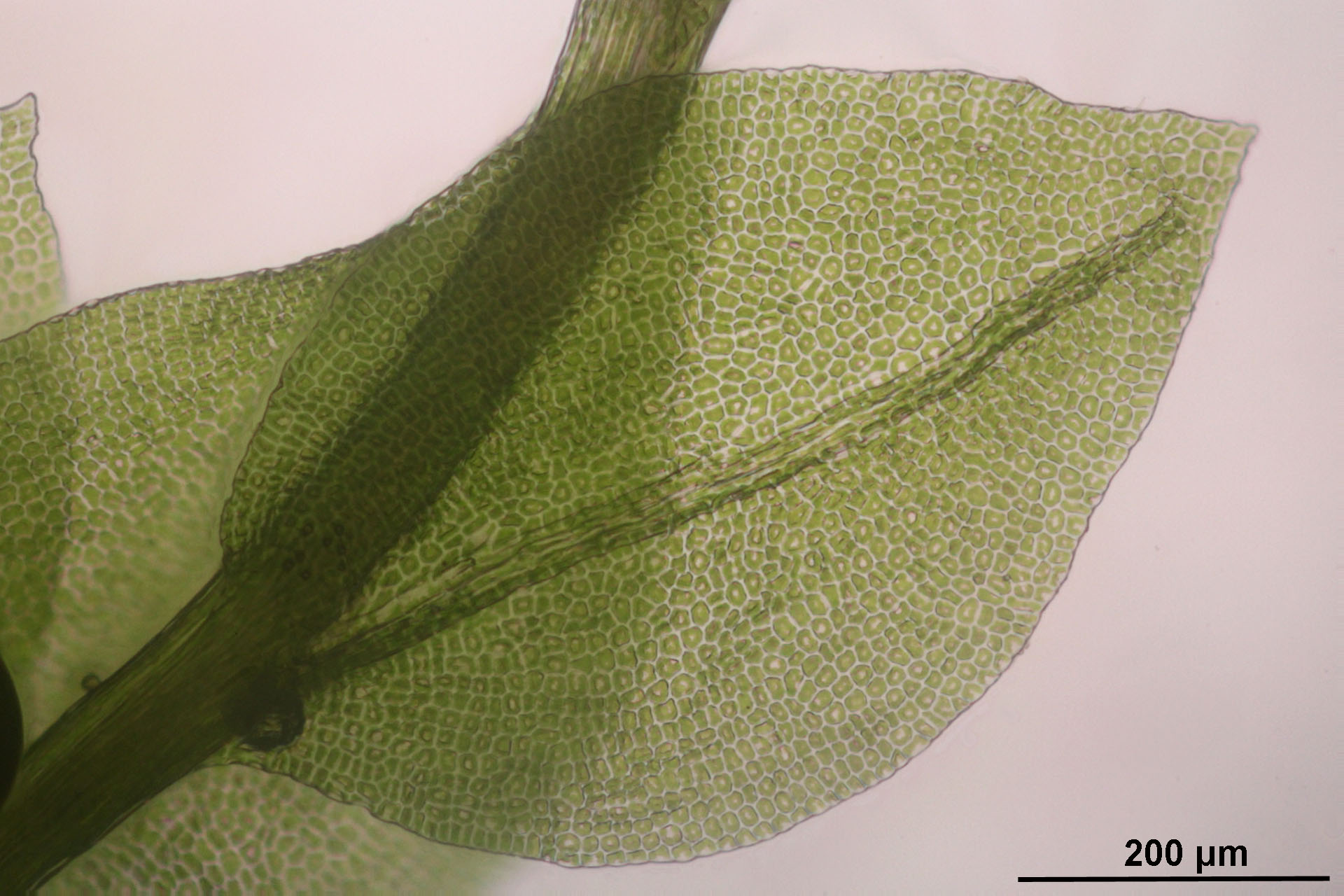
Tetraphis pellucida

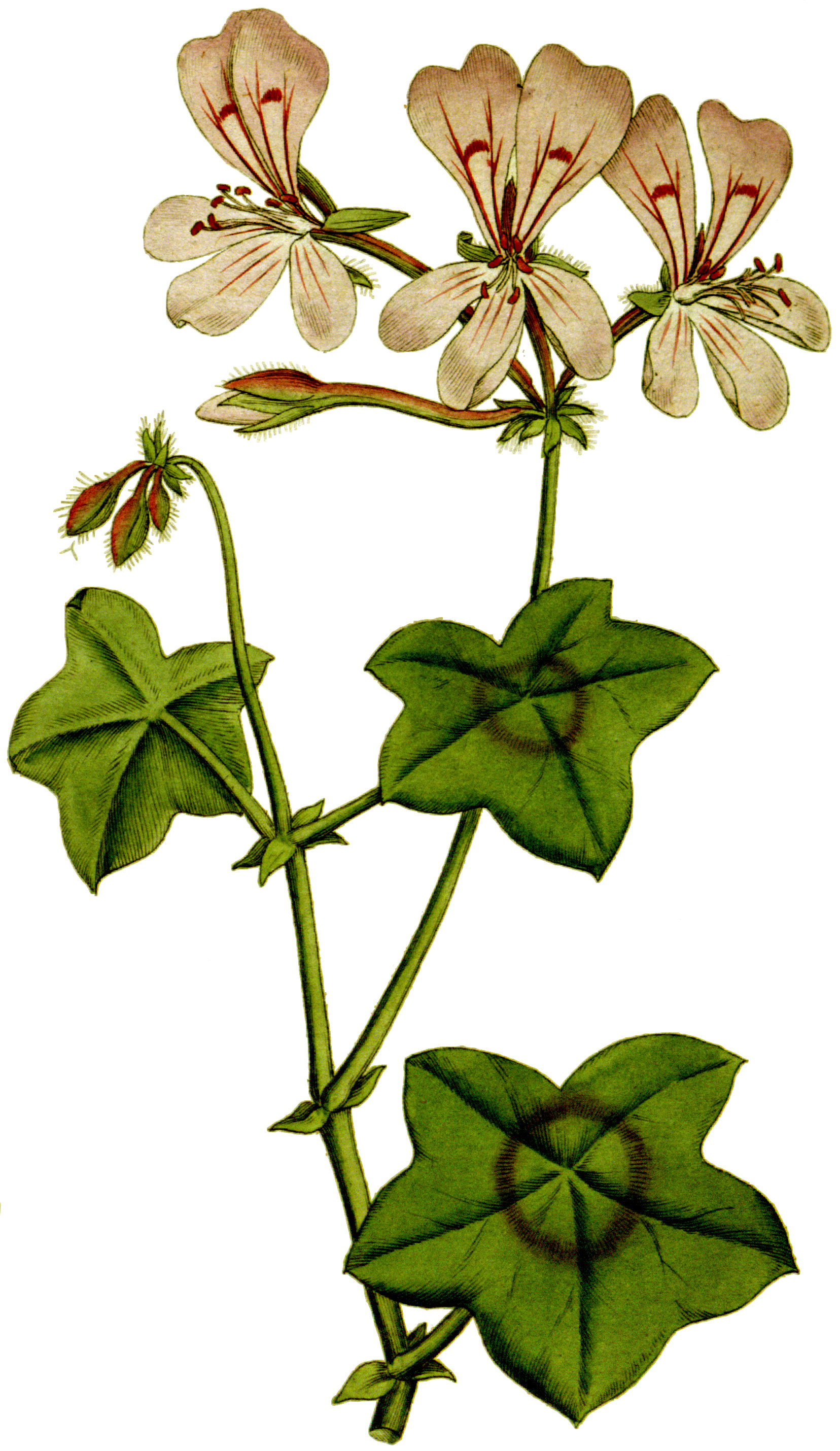
Illustration of Pelargonium peltatum

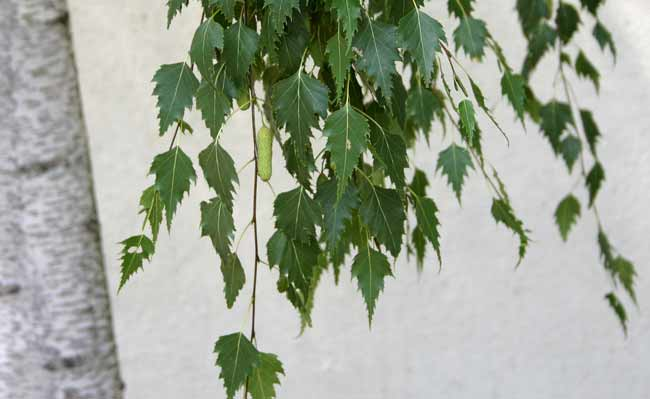
Betula pendula

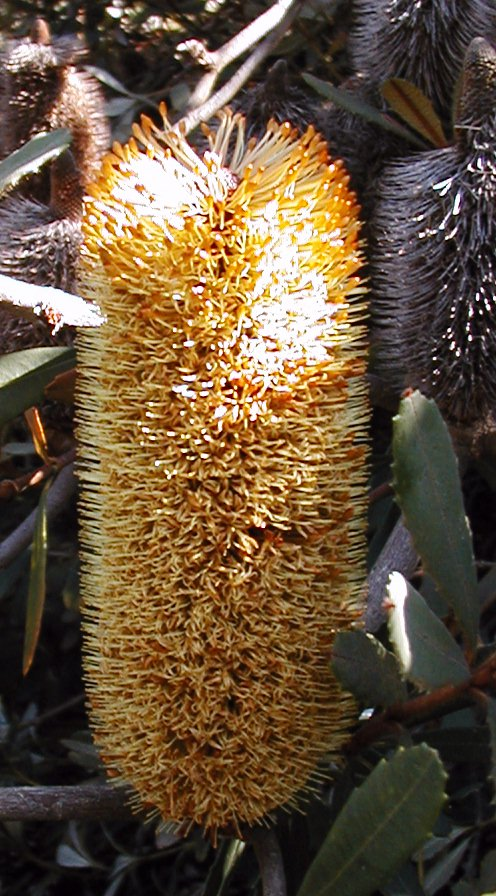
Banksia penicillata

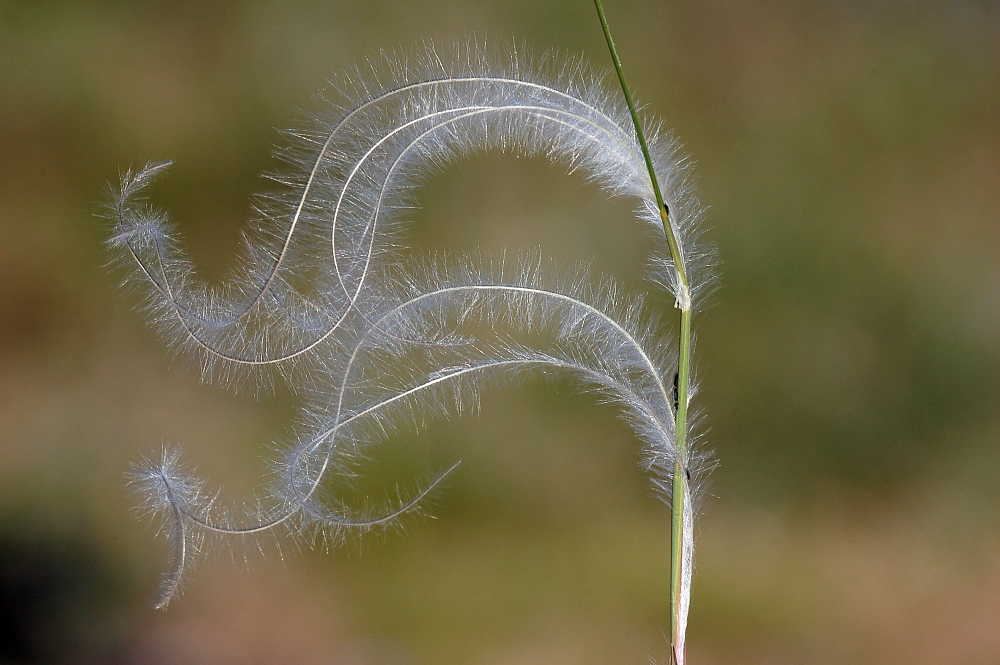
Stipa pennata

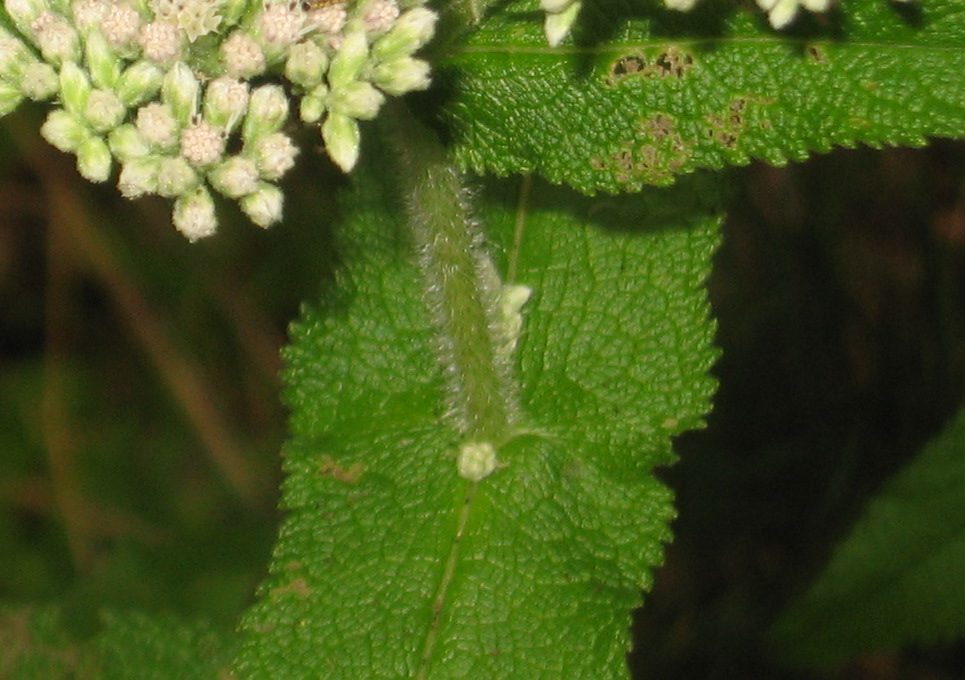
Eupatorium perfoliatum

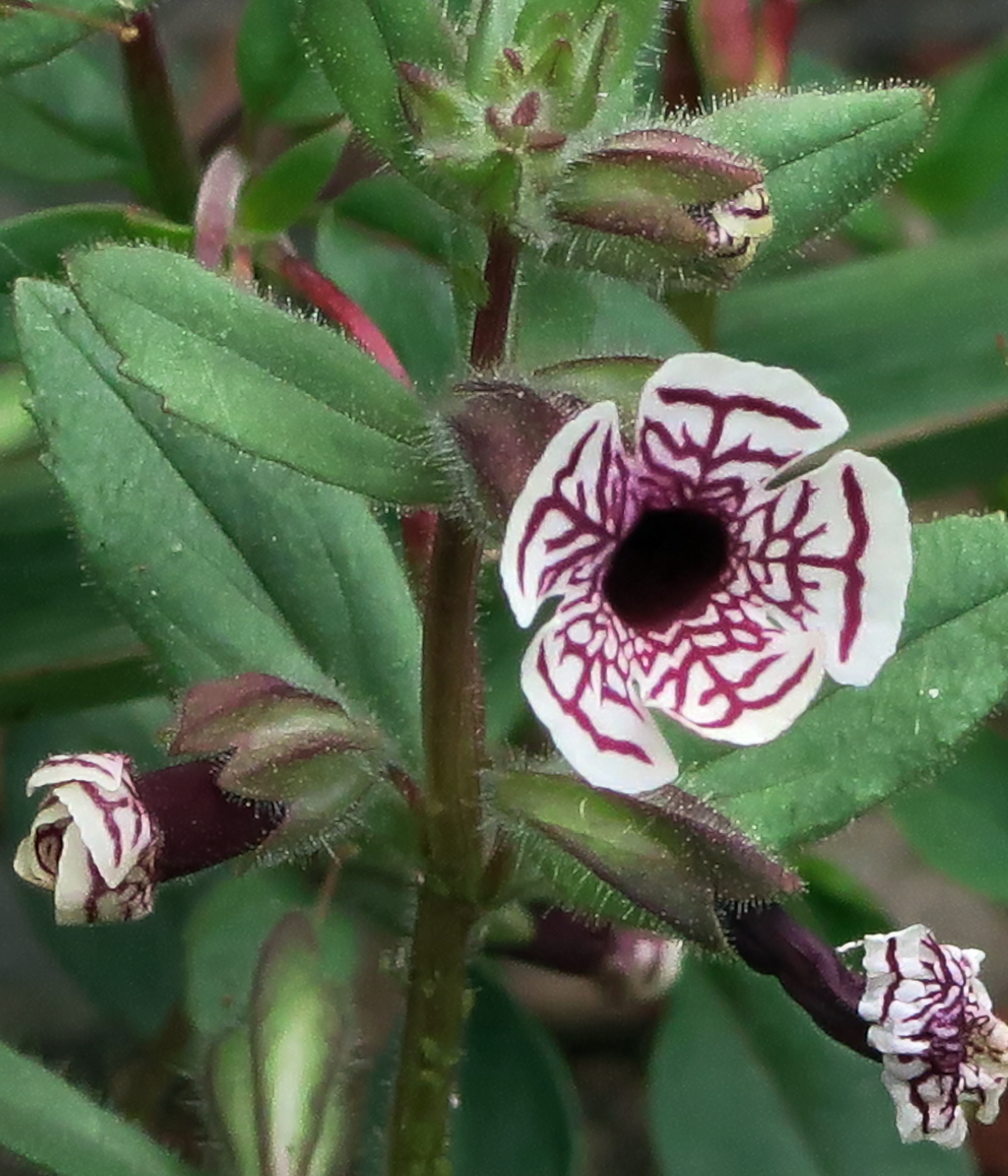
Diplacus pictus

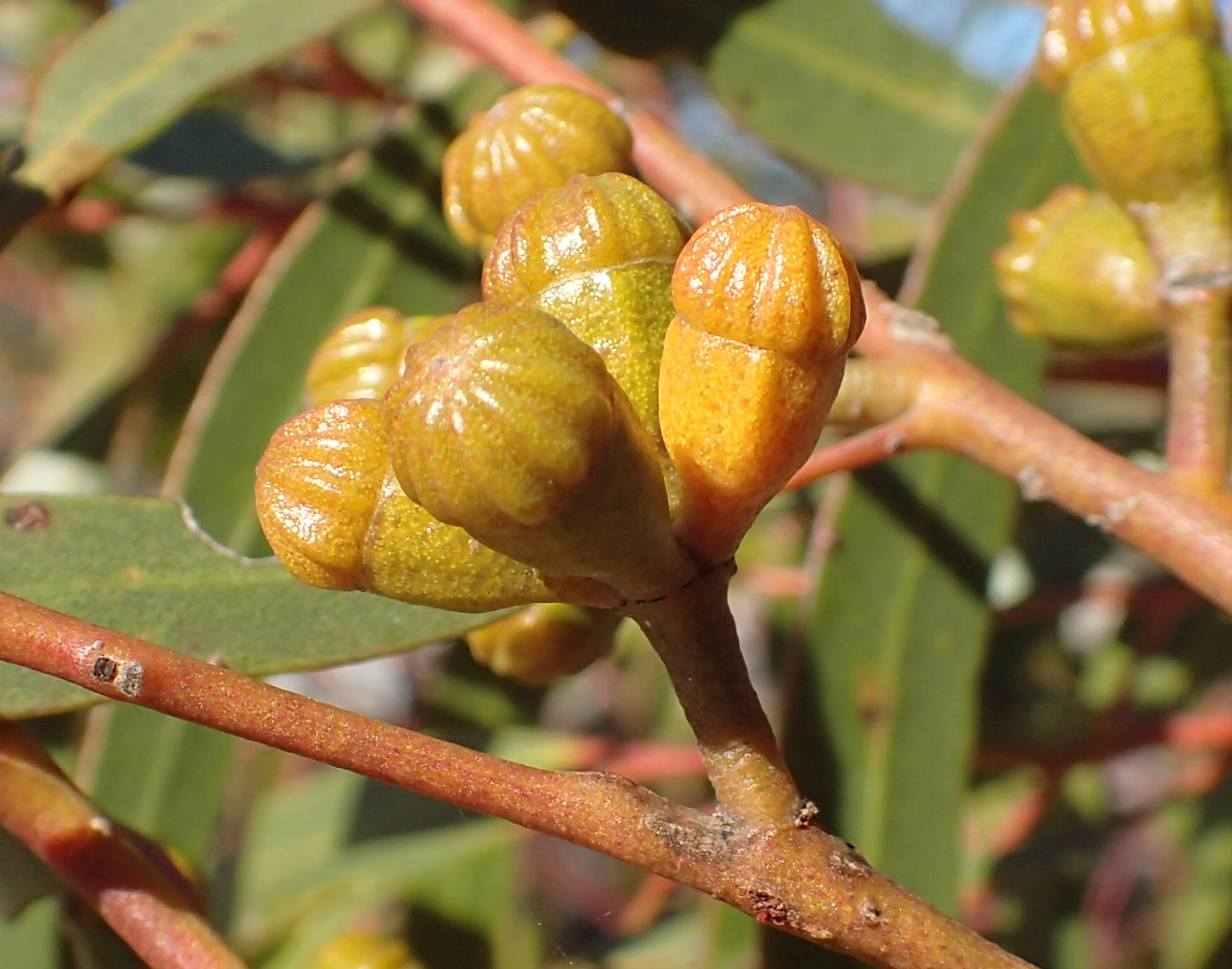
Eucalyptus pileata

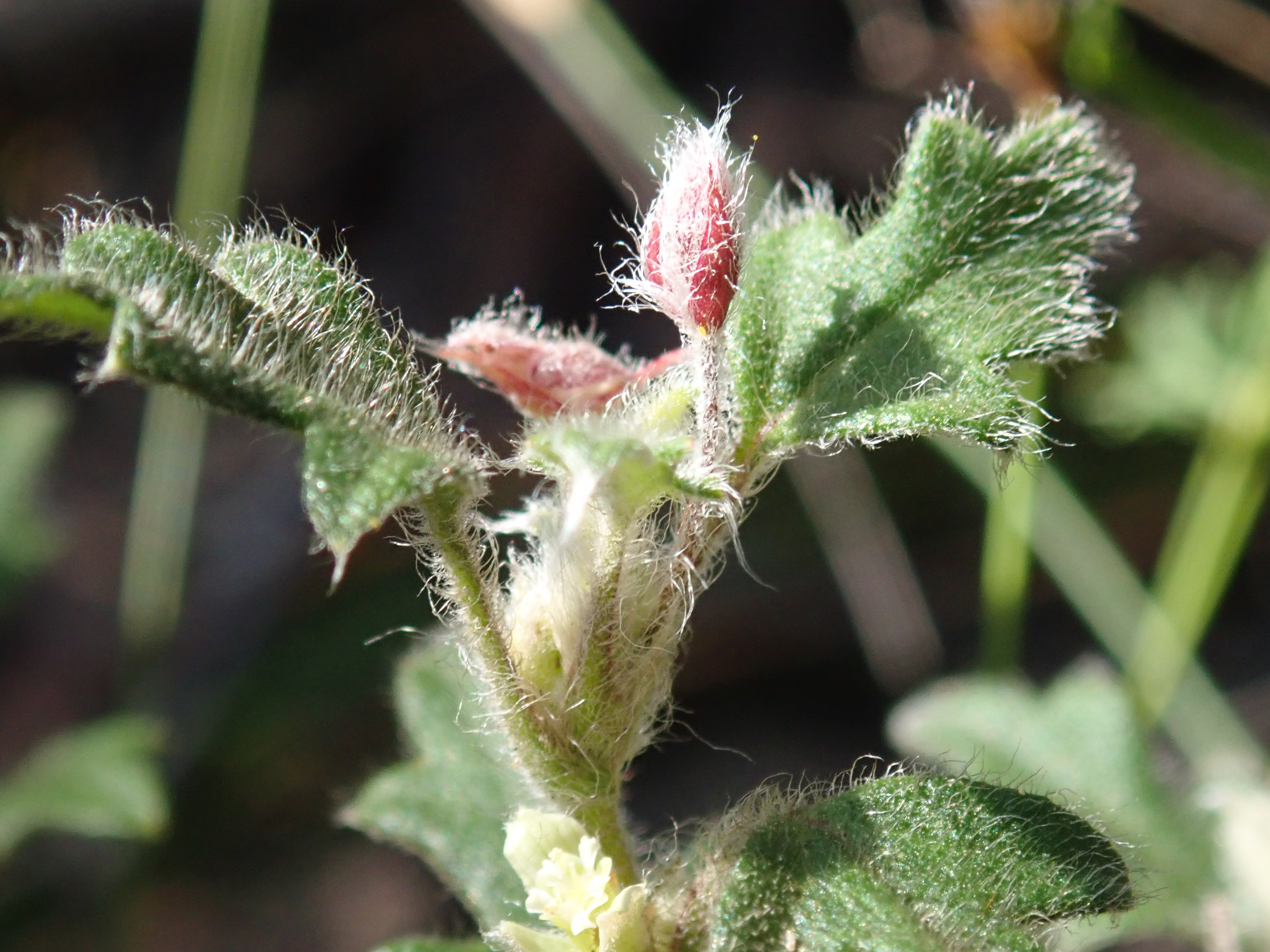
Xanthosia pilosa

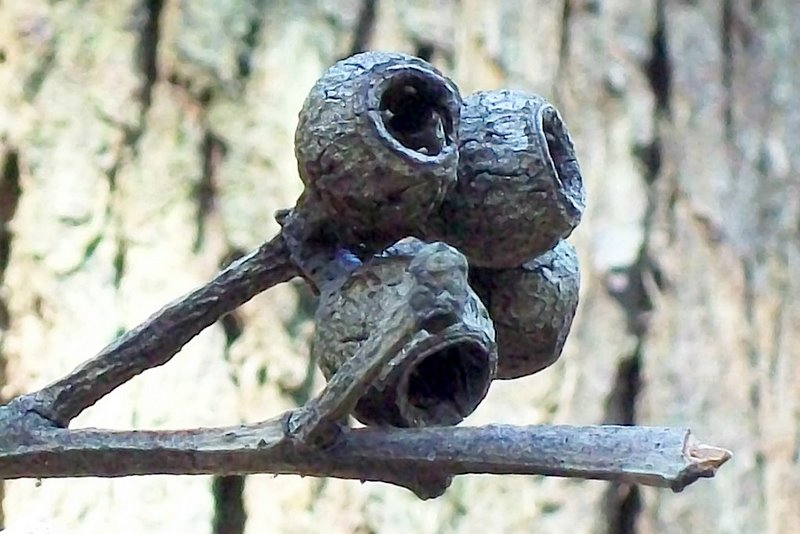
Eucalyptus pilularis

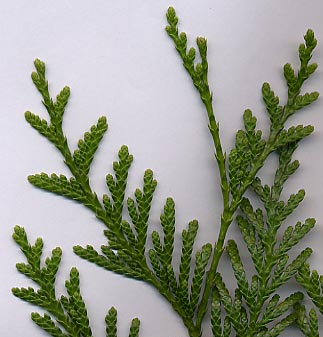
Thuja plicata

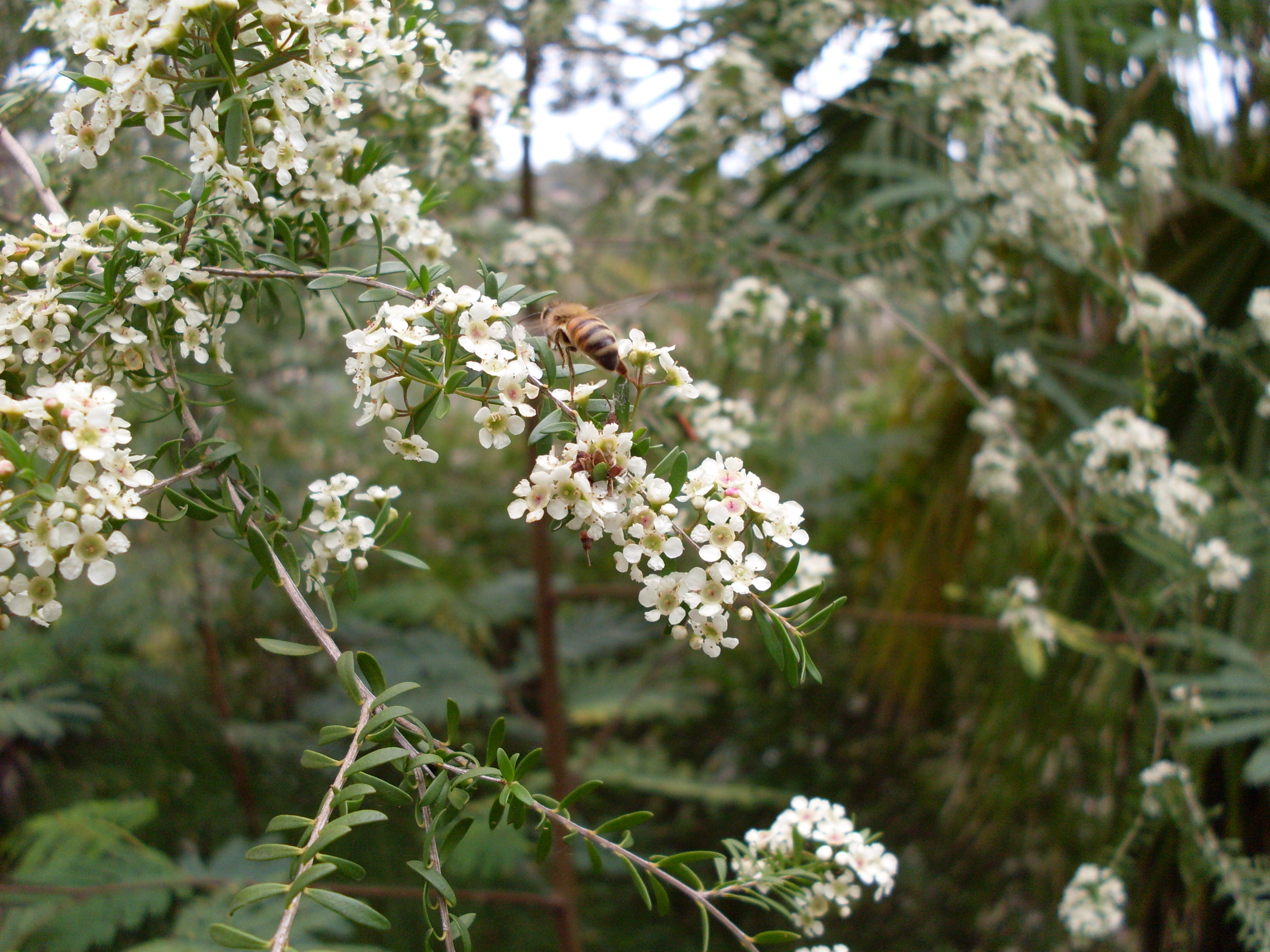
Sannantha pluriflora

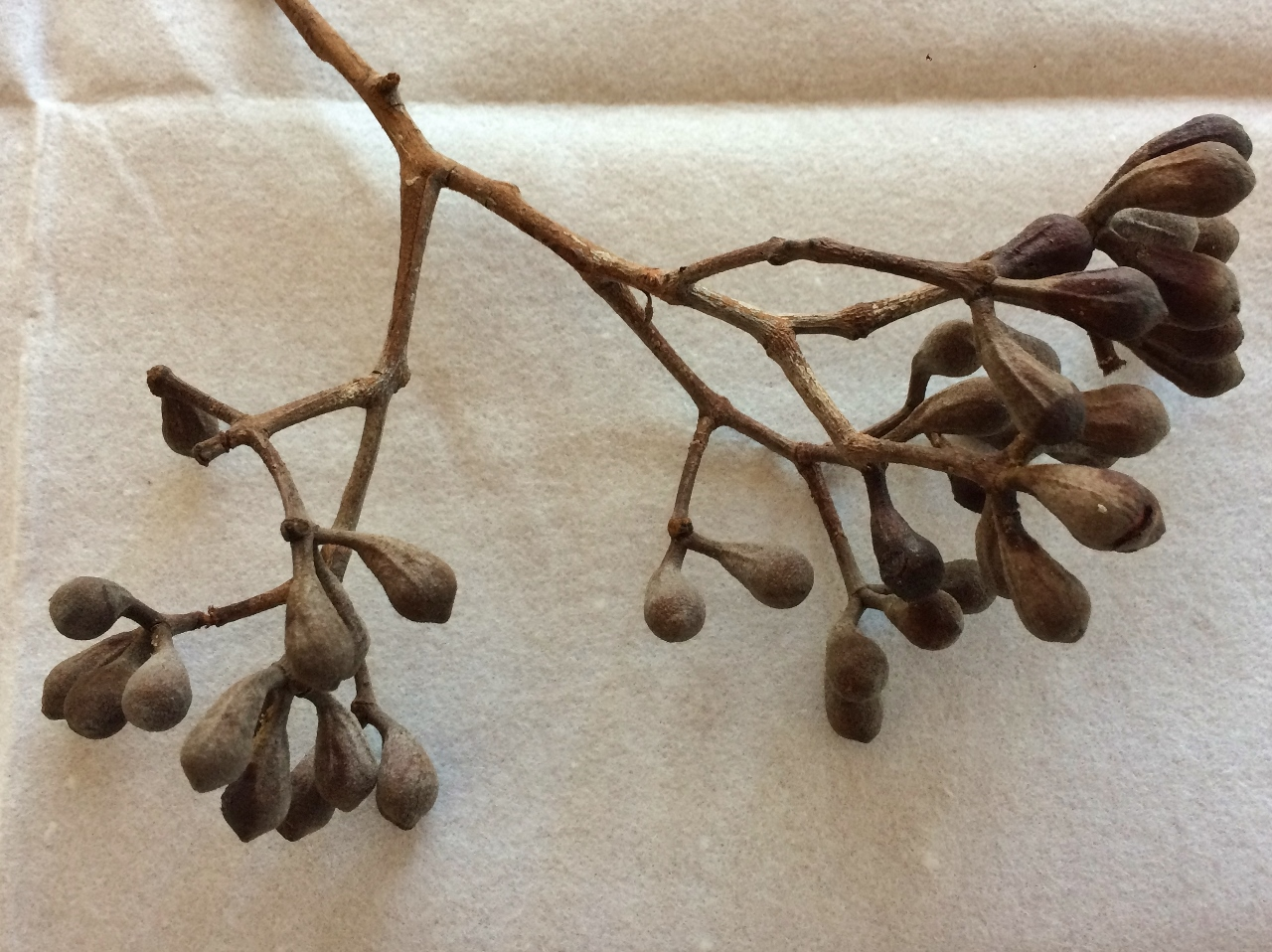
Corymbia polycarpa

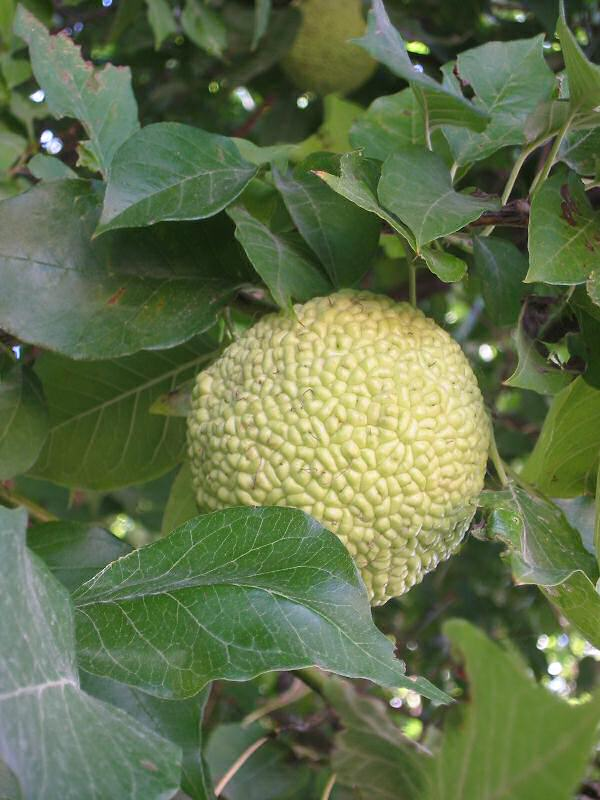
Maclura pomifera

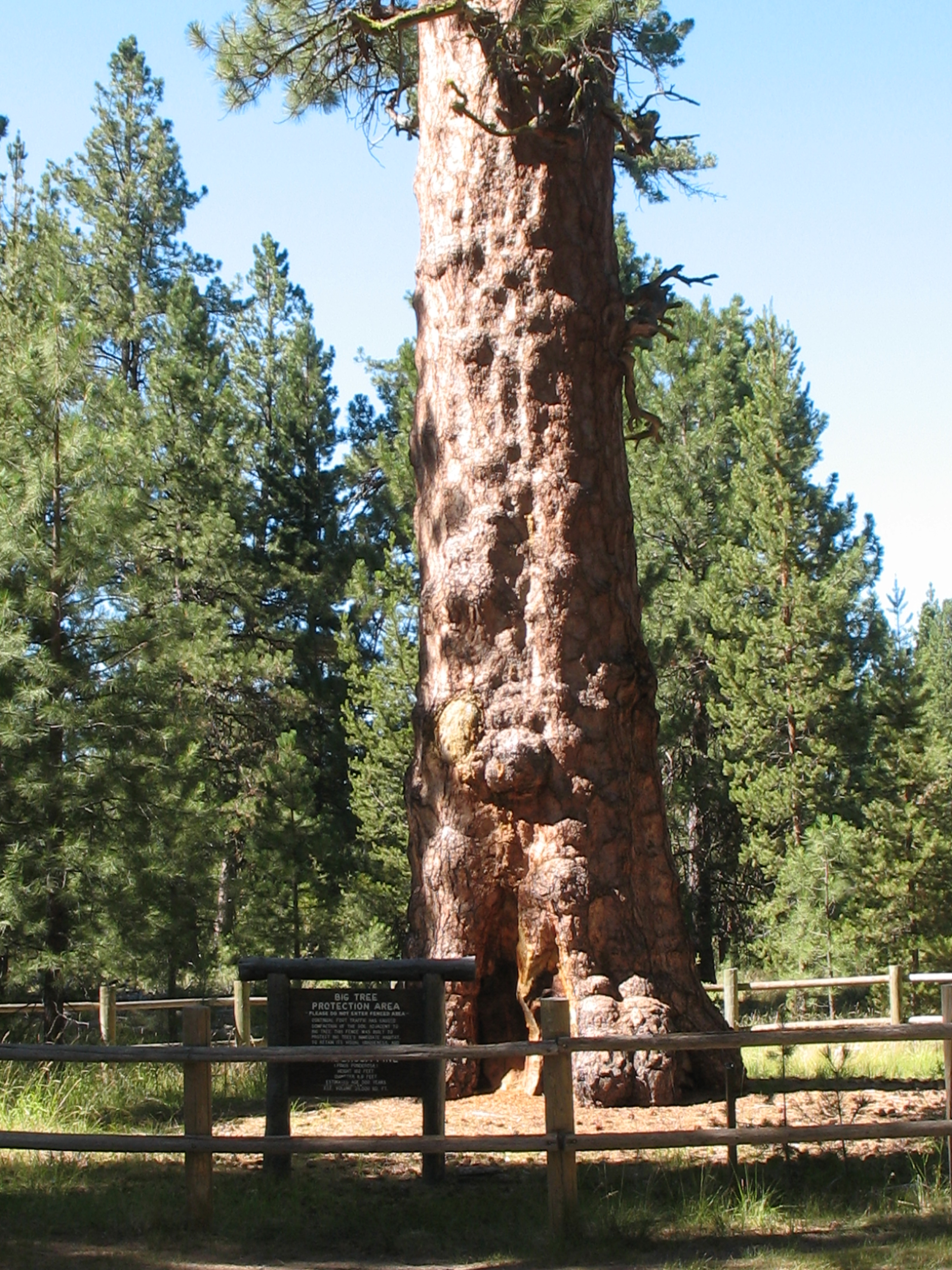
Pinus ponderosa

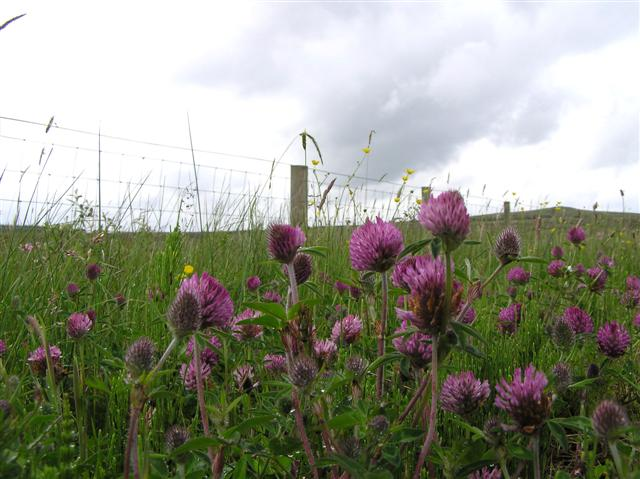
Trifolium pratense

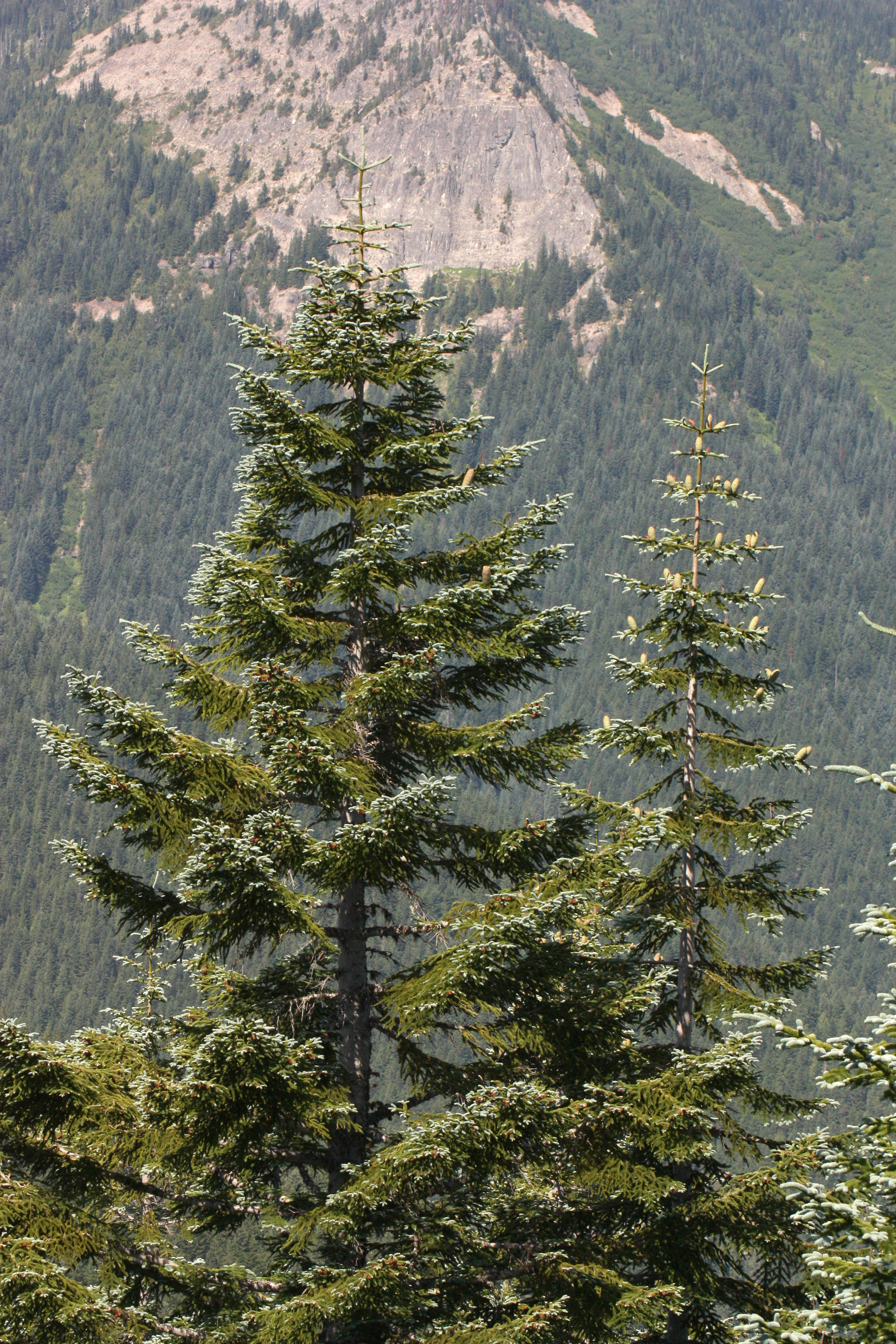
Abies procera

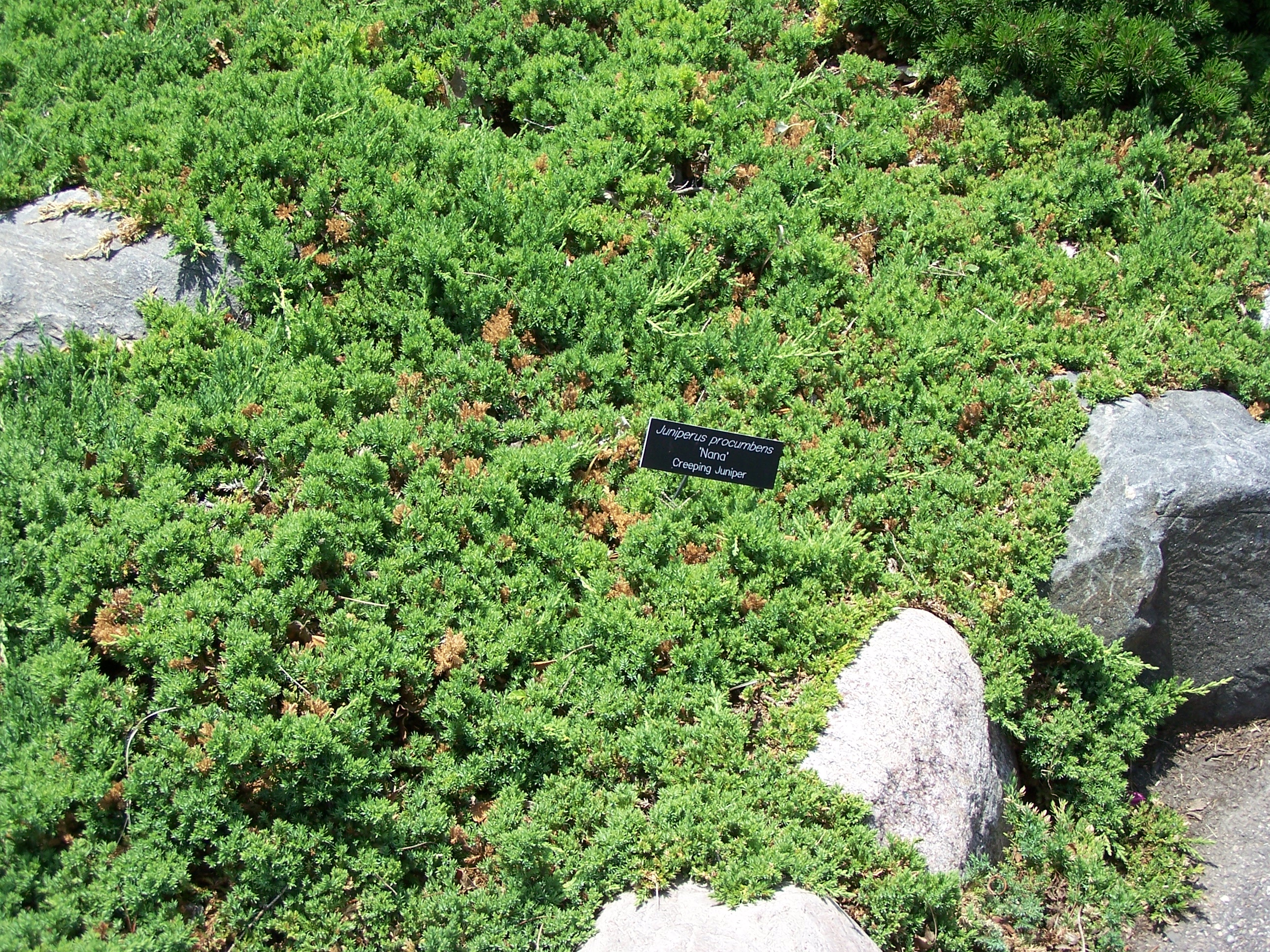
Juniperus procumbens

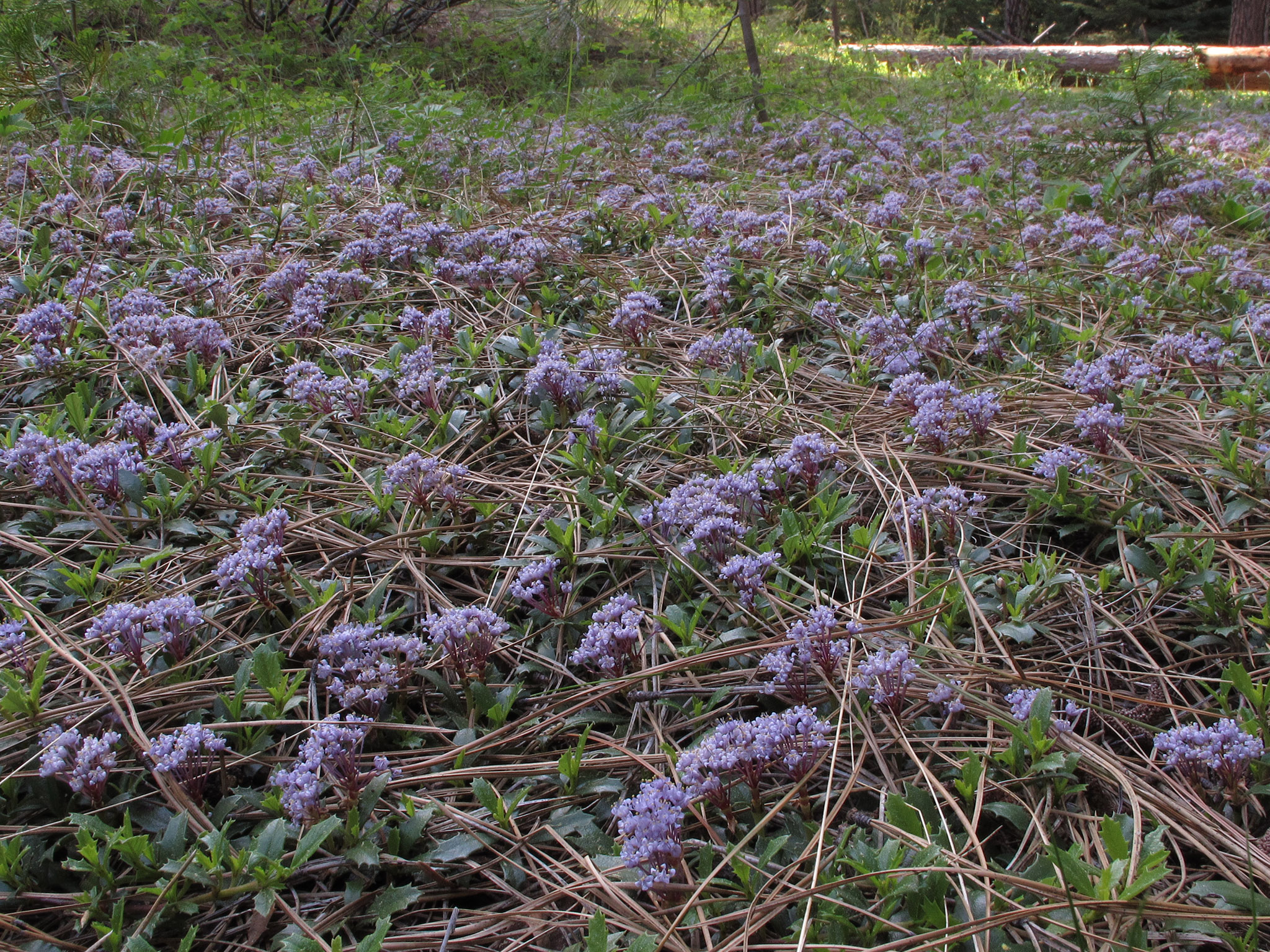
Ceanothus prostratus

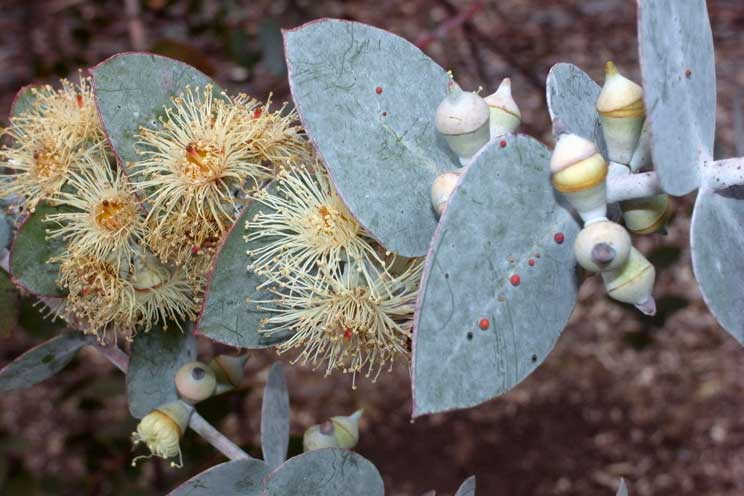
Eucalyptus pulverulenta

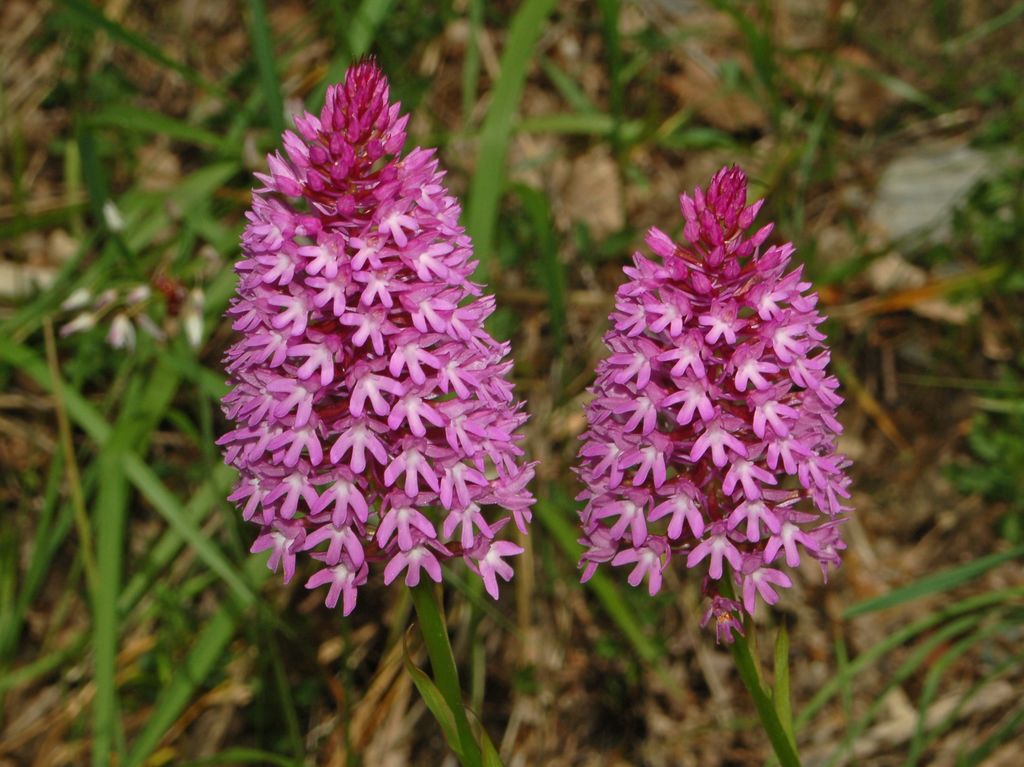
Anacamptis pyramidalis

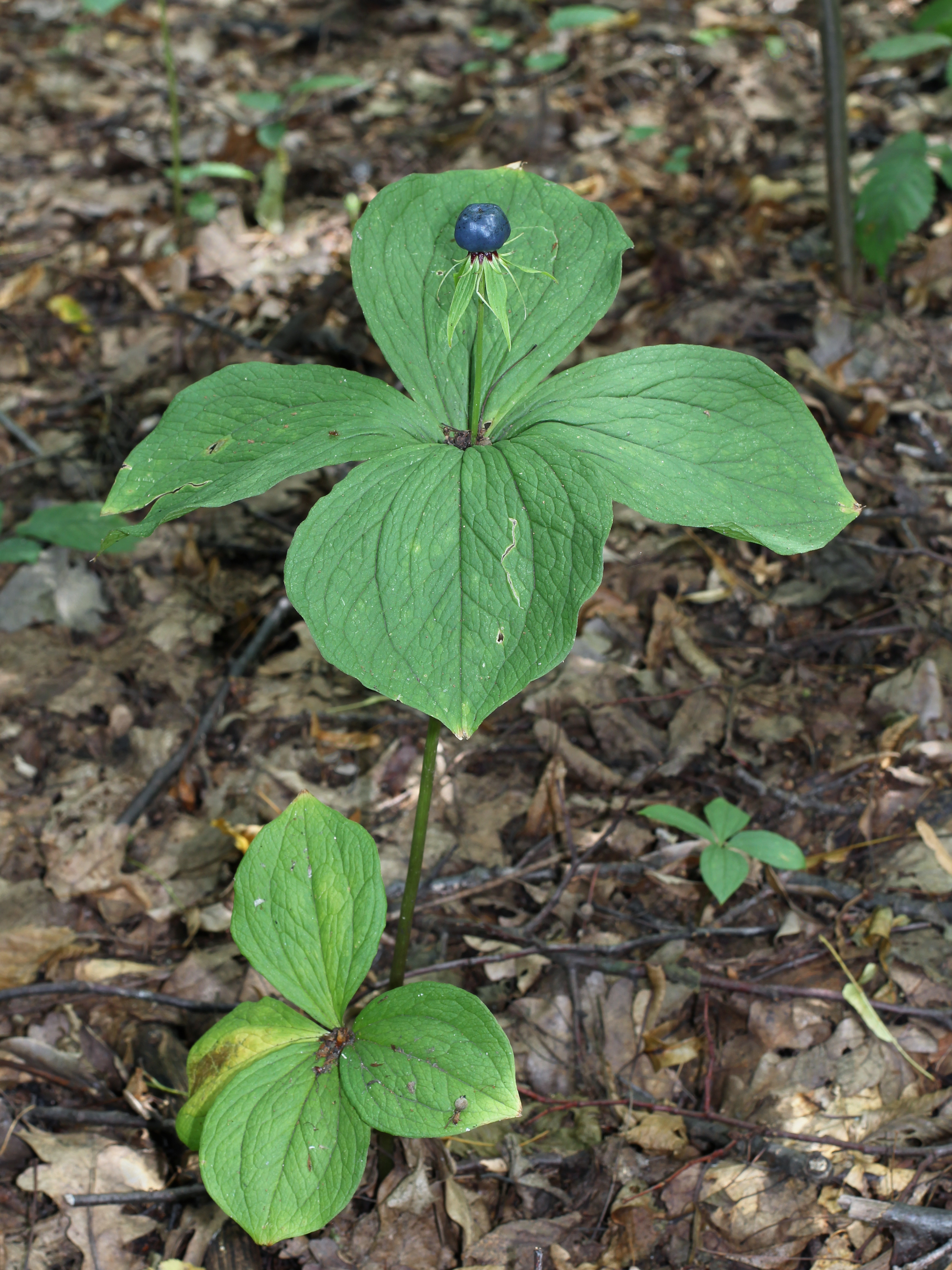
Paris quadrifolia

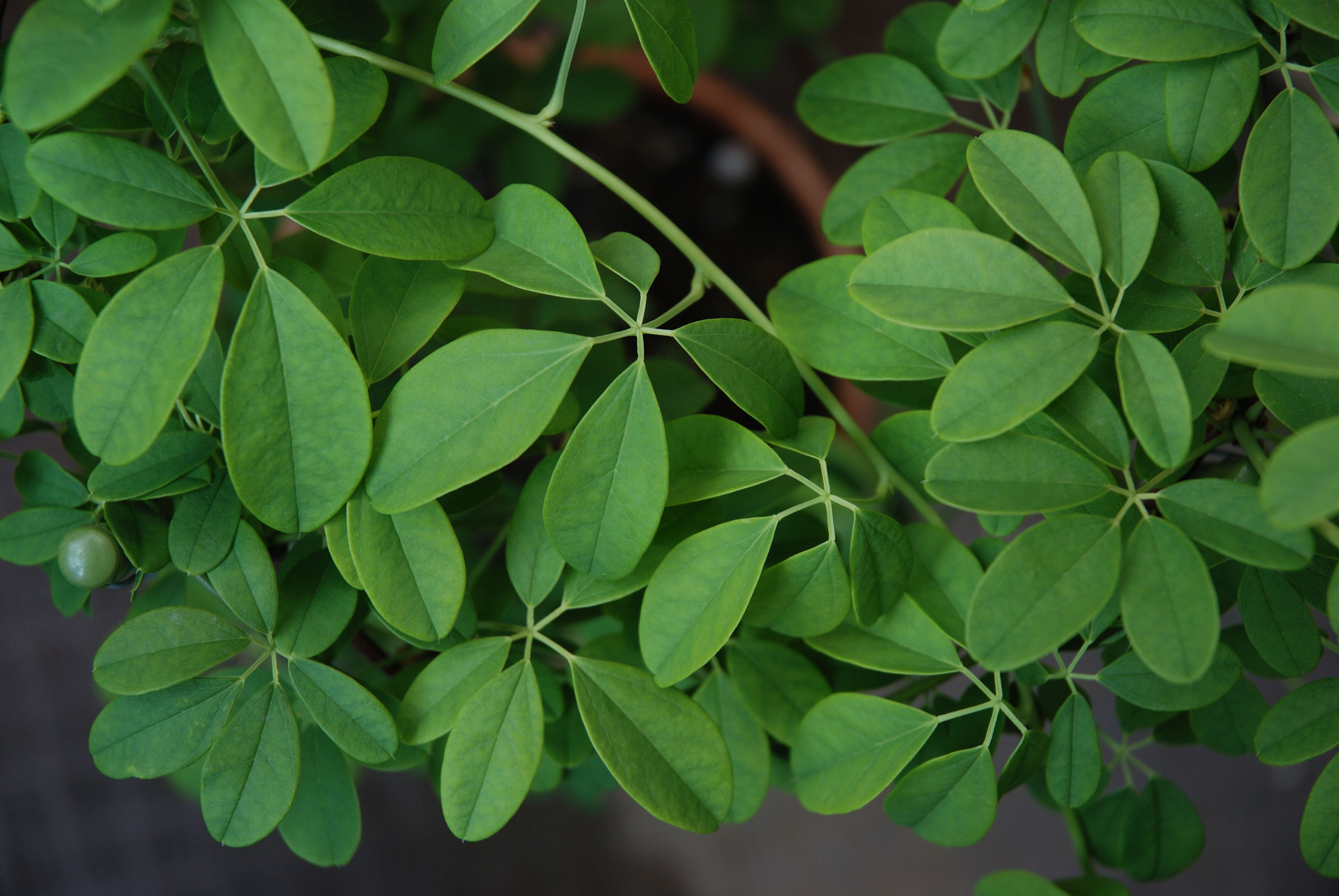
Akebia quinata

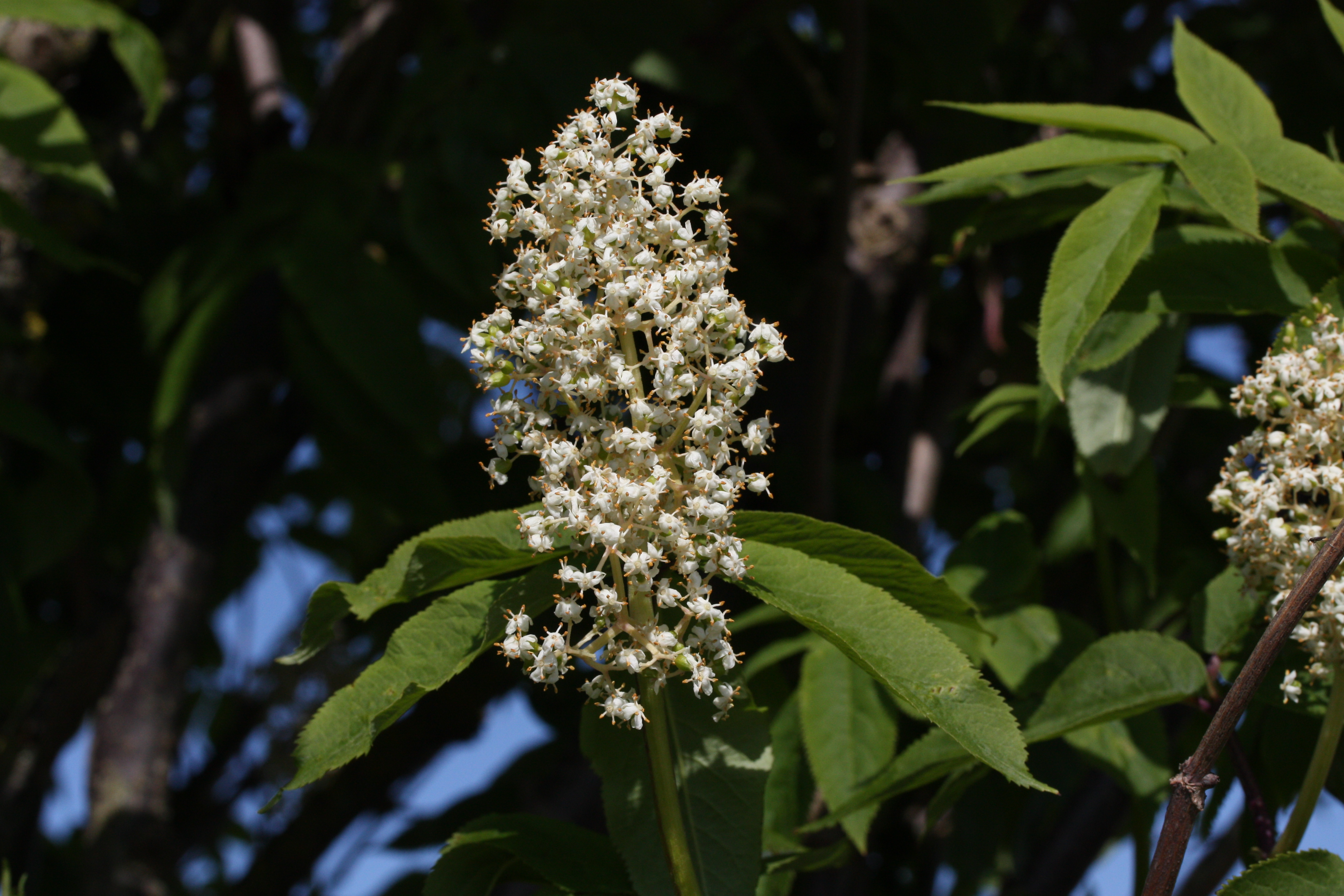
Sambucus racemosa

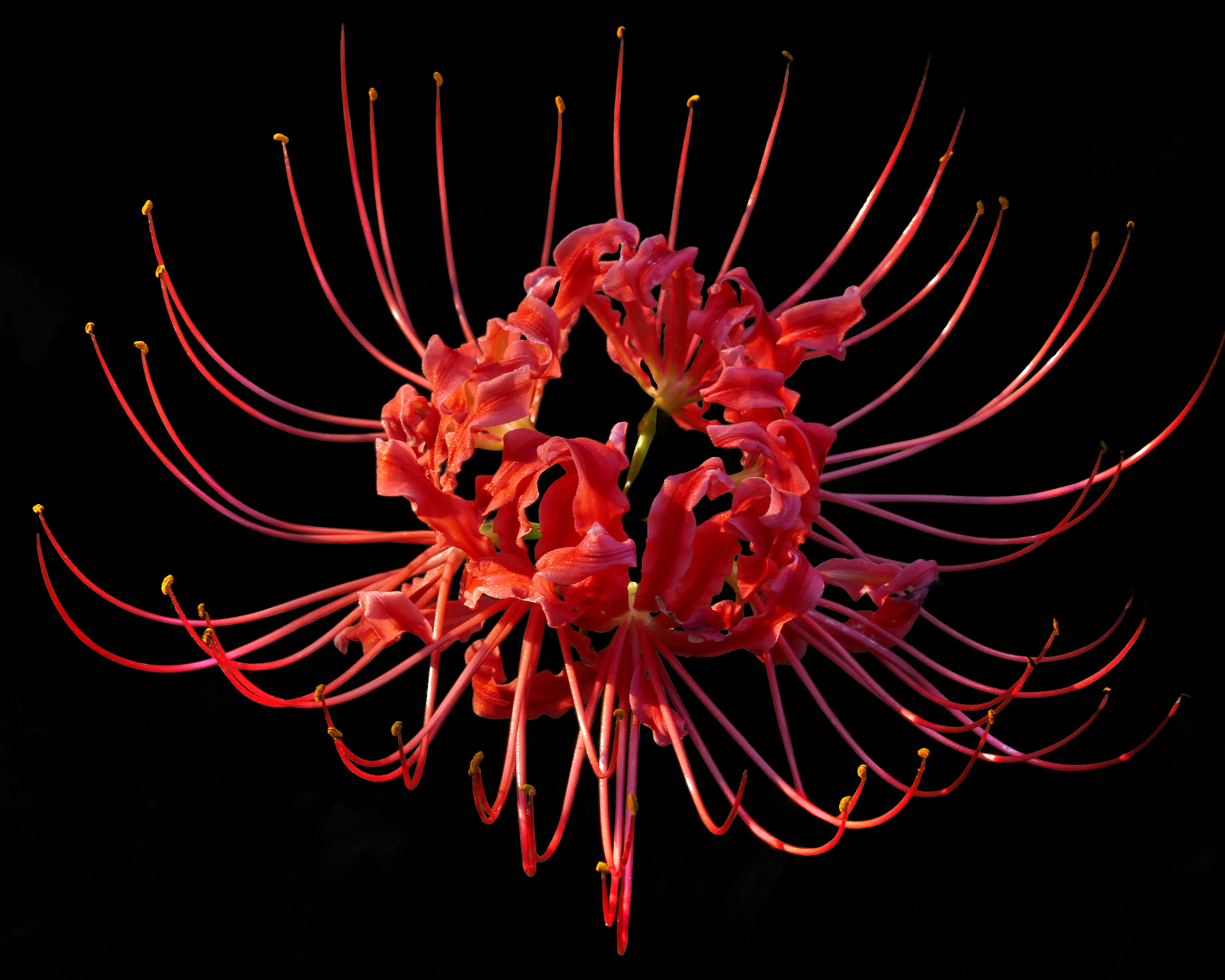
Lycoris radiata

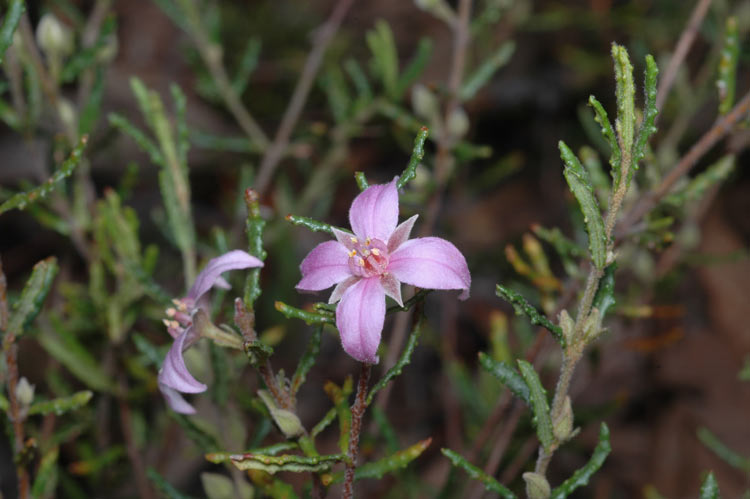
Boronia repanda

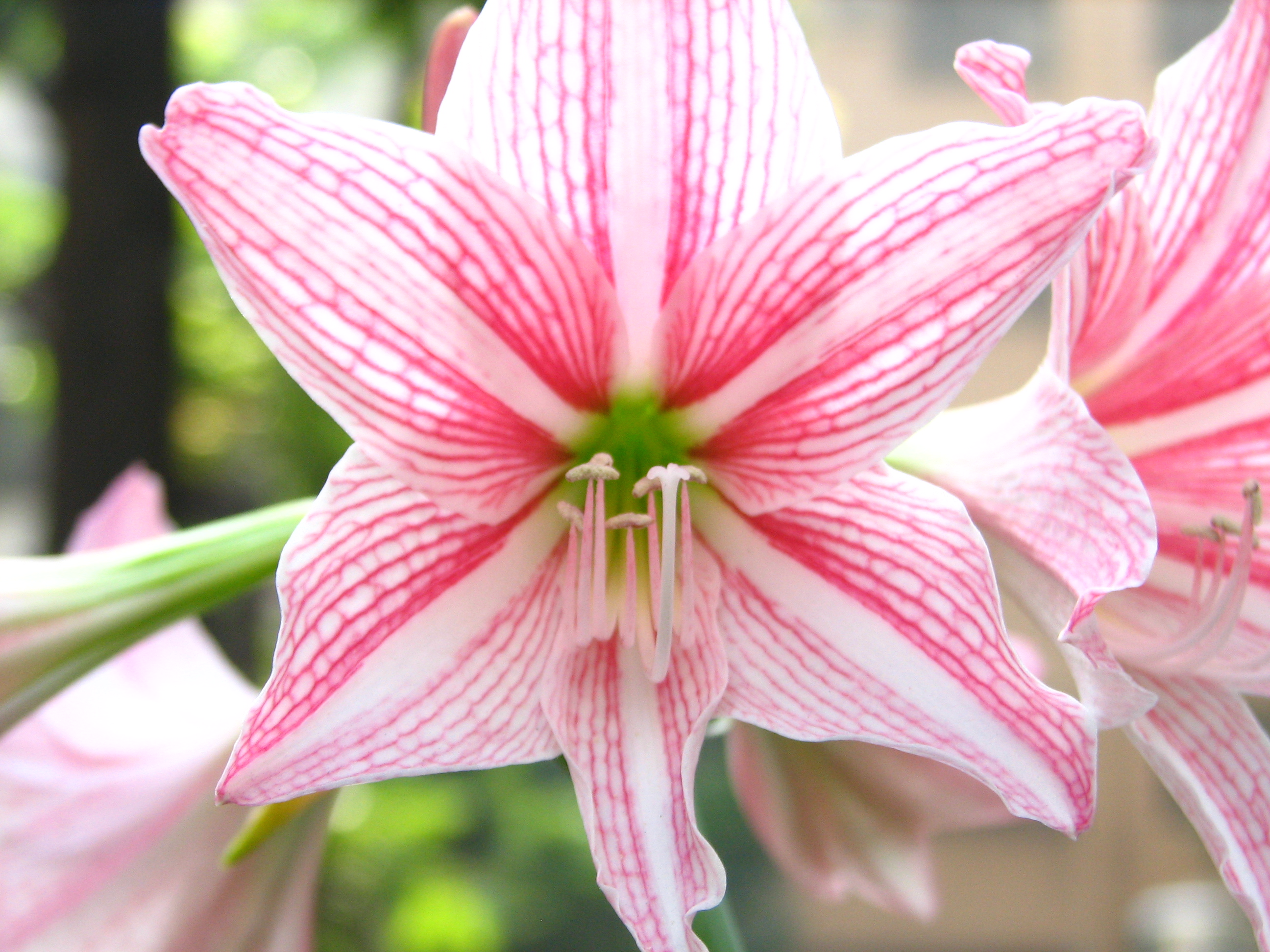
Hippeastrum reticulatum

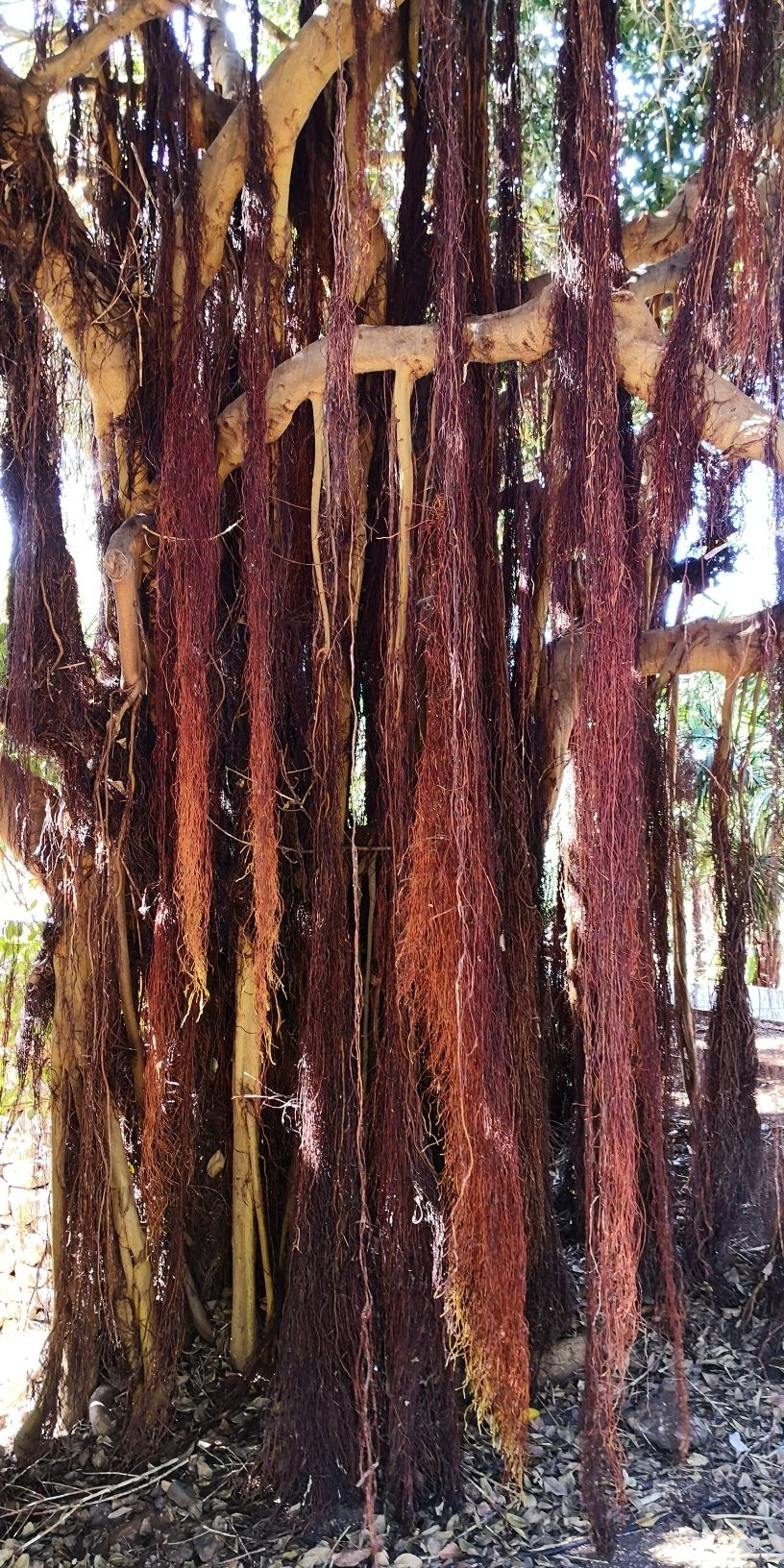
Ficus rubiginosa

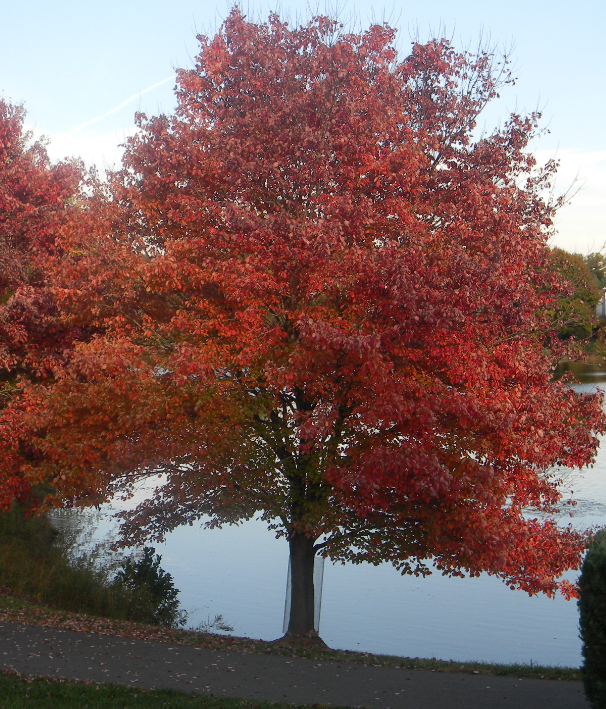
Acer rubrum

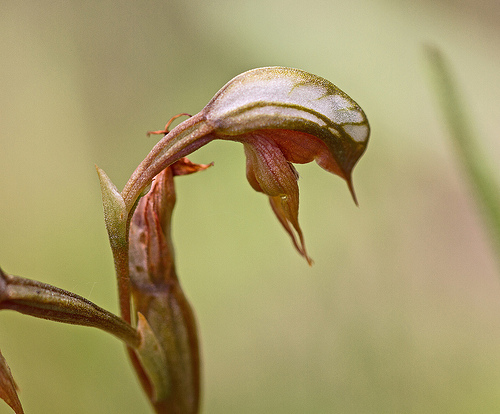
Pterostylis rufa

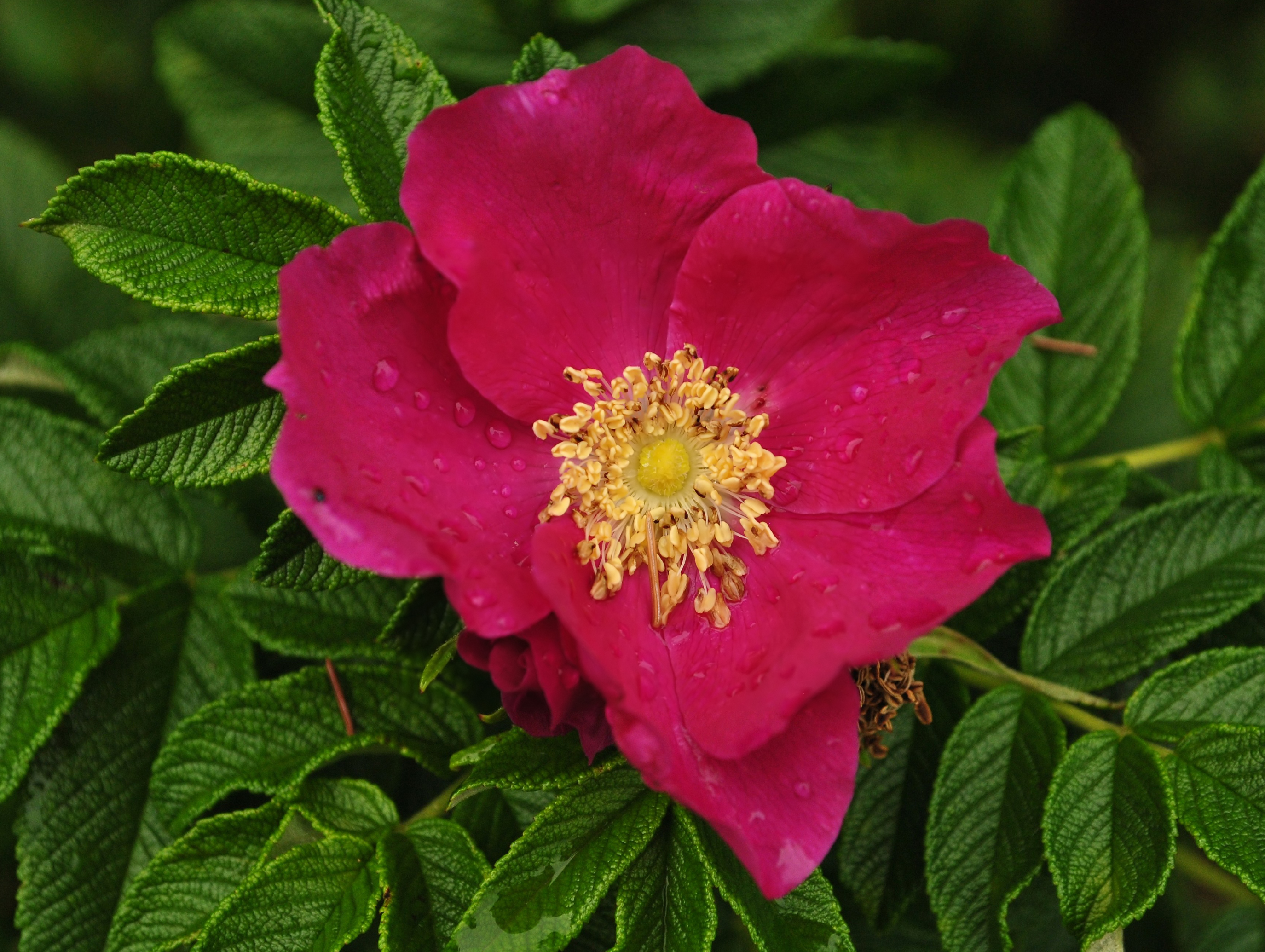
Rosa rugosa

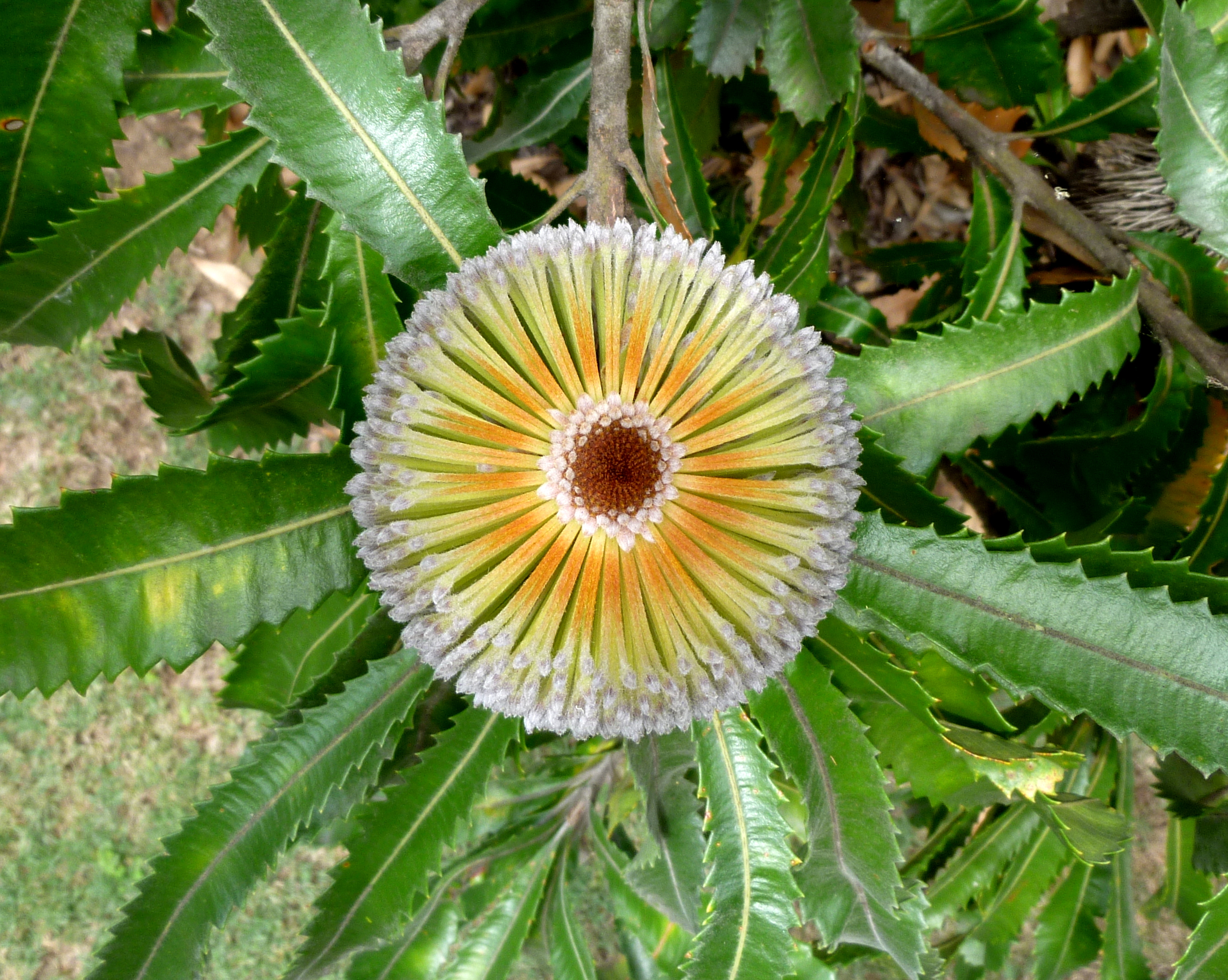
Banksia serrata

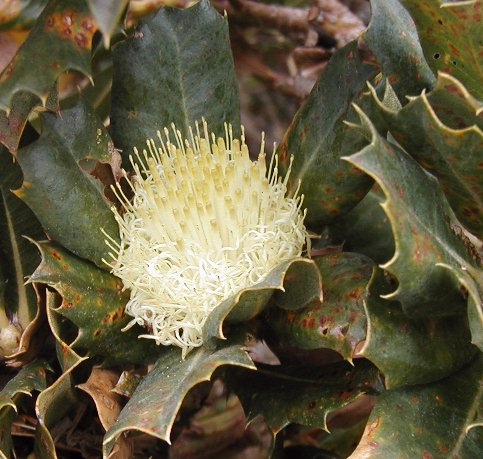
Banksia sessilis

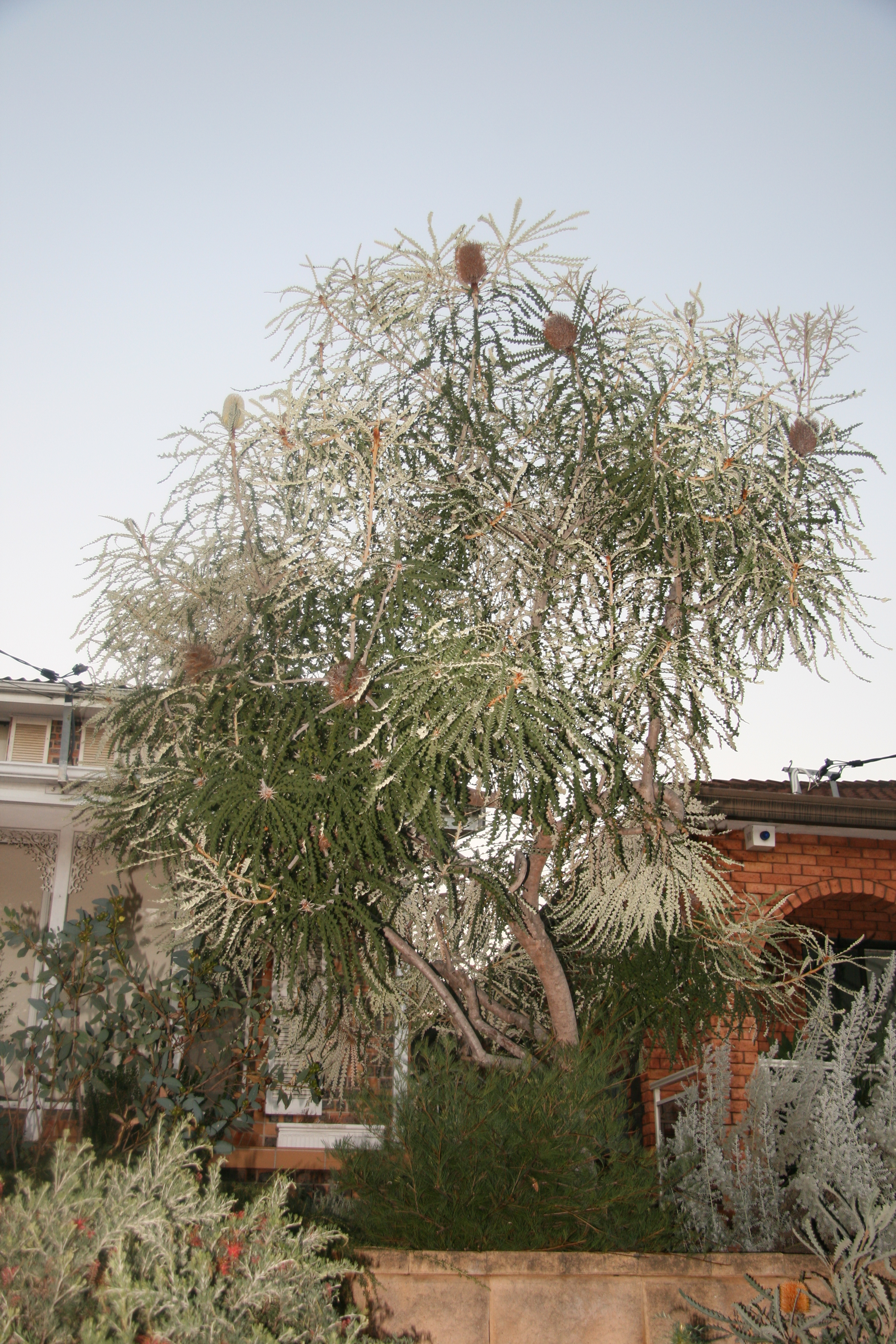
Banksia speciosa

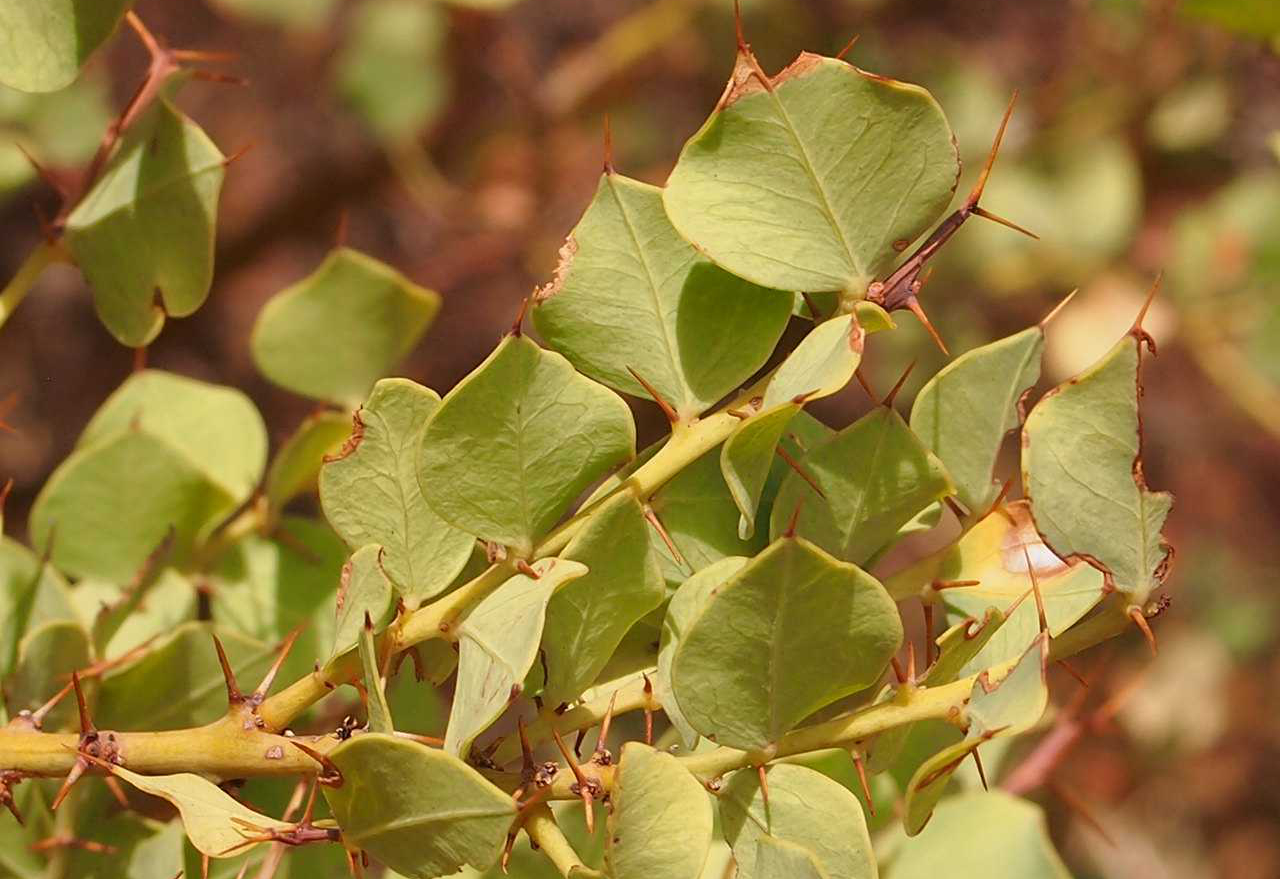
Acacia strongylophylla

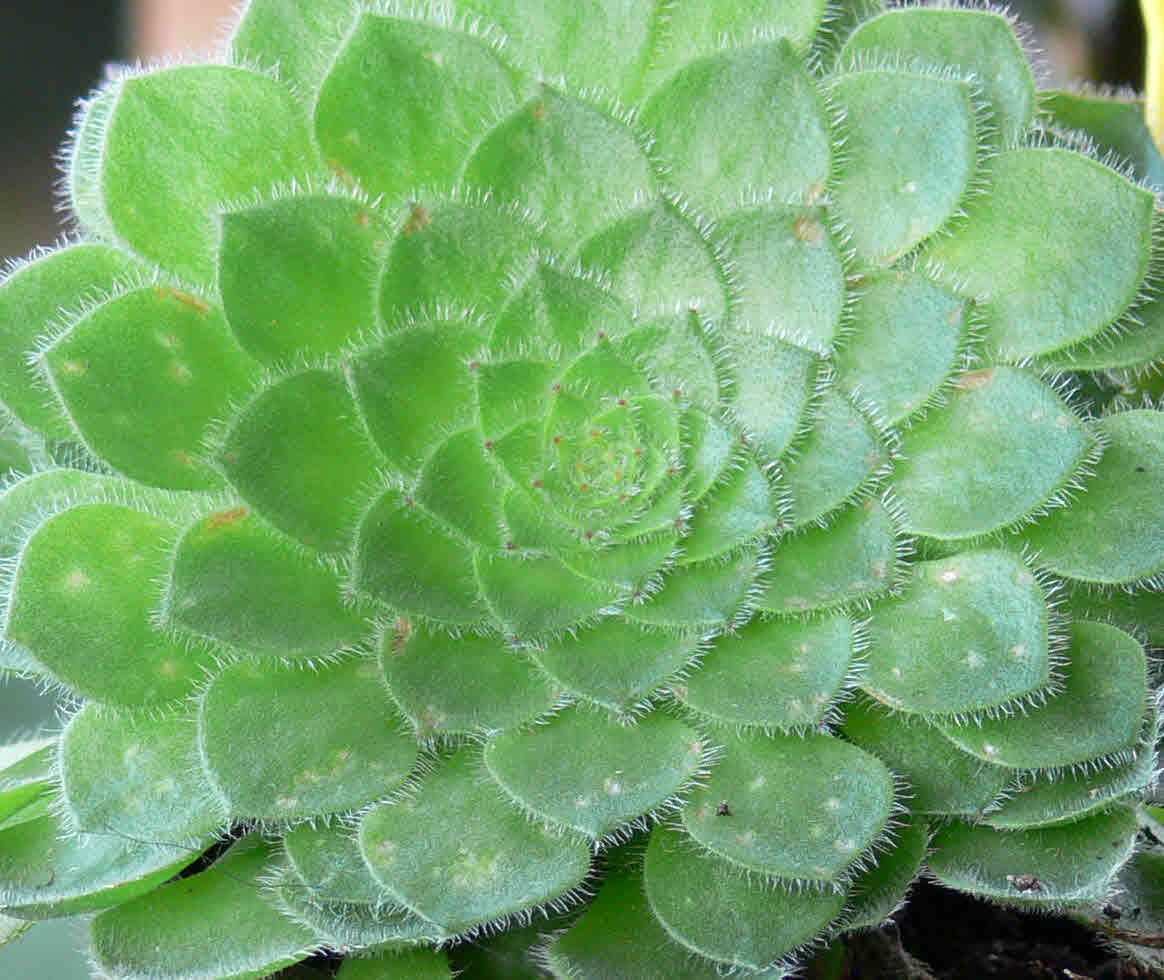
Aeonium tabuliforme

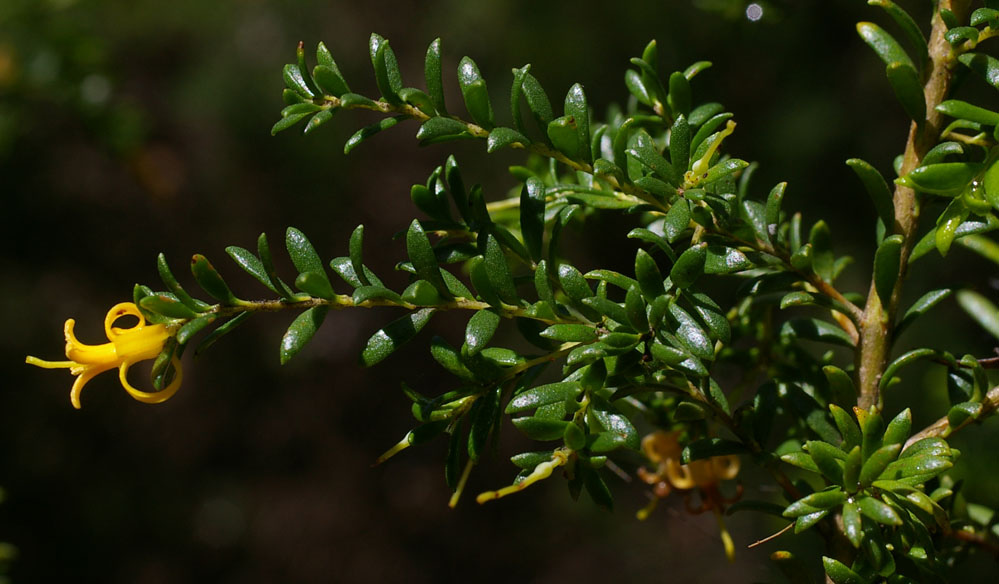
Persoonia terminalis

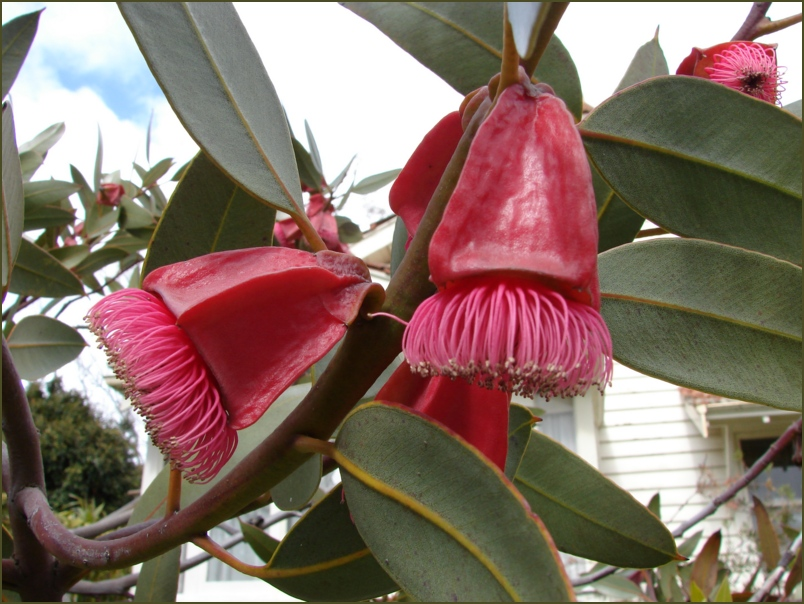
Eucalyptus tetraptera

Indigofera tinctoria

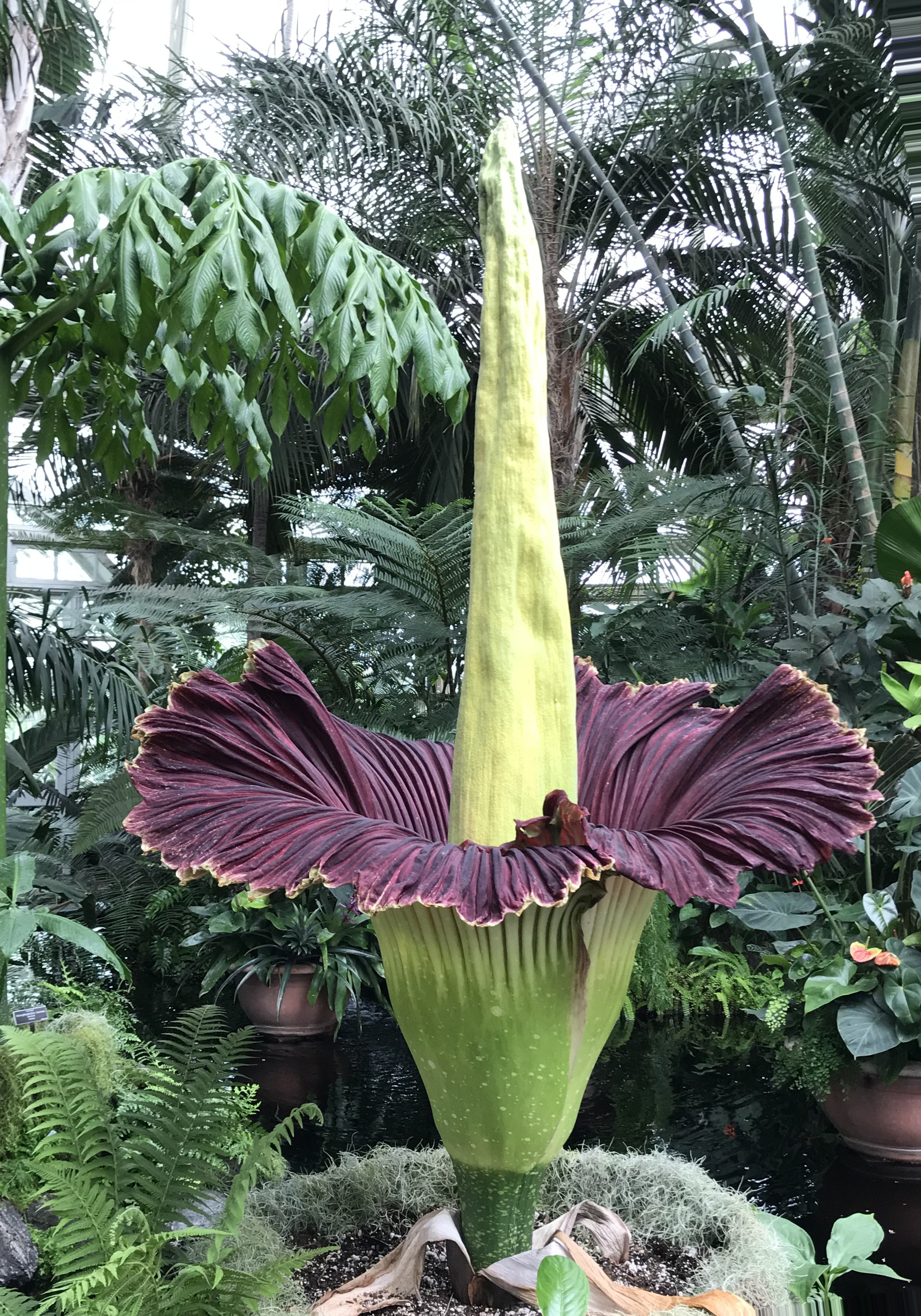
Amorphophallus titanum

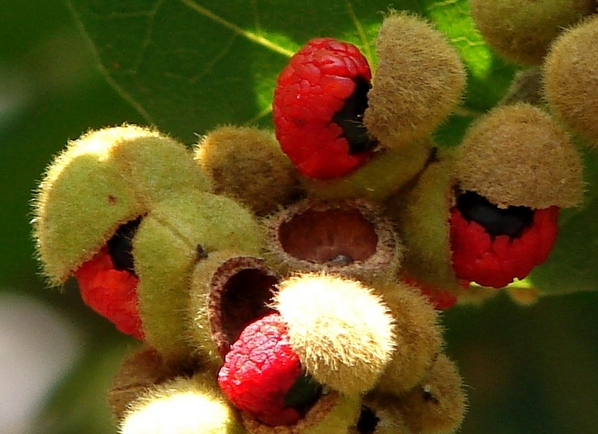
Alectryon tomentosus

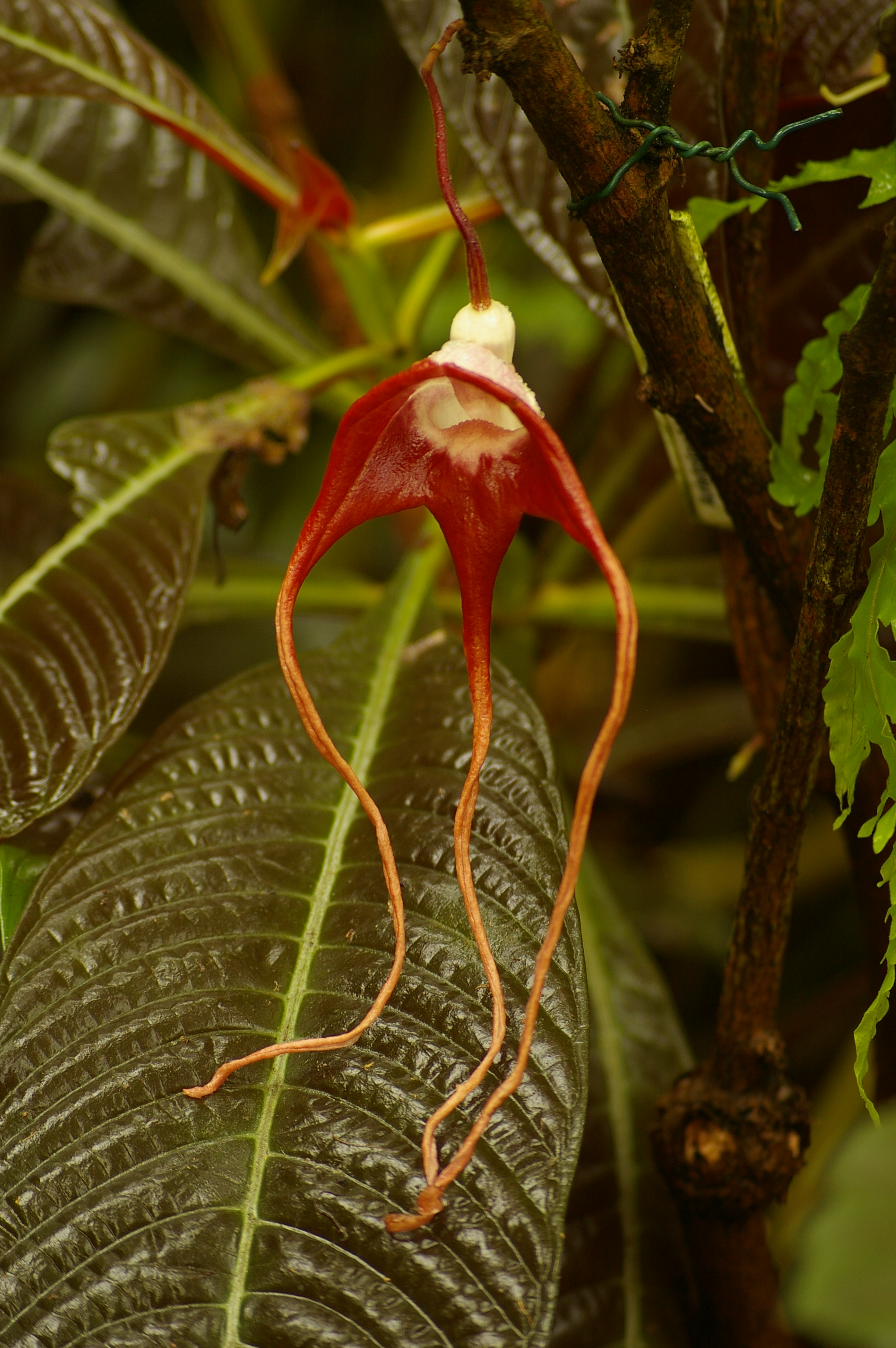
Aristolochia tricaudata

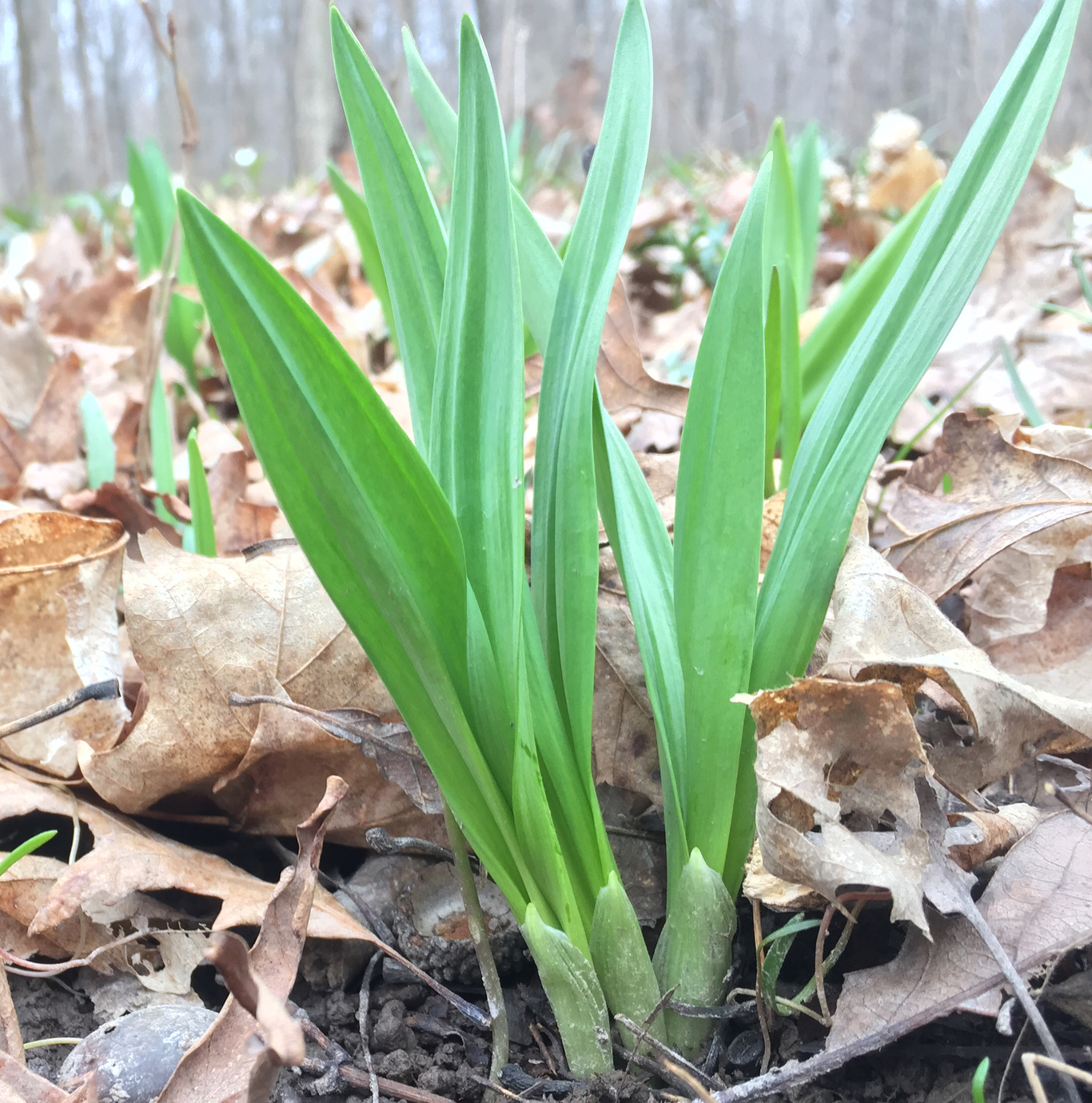
Allium tricoccum

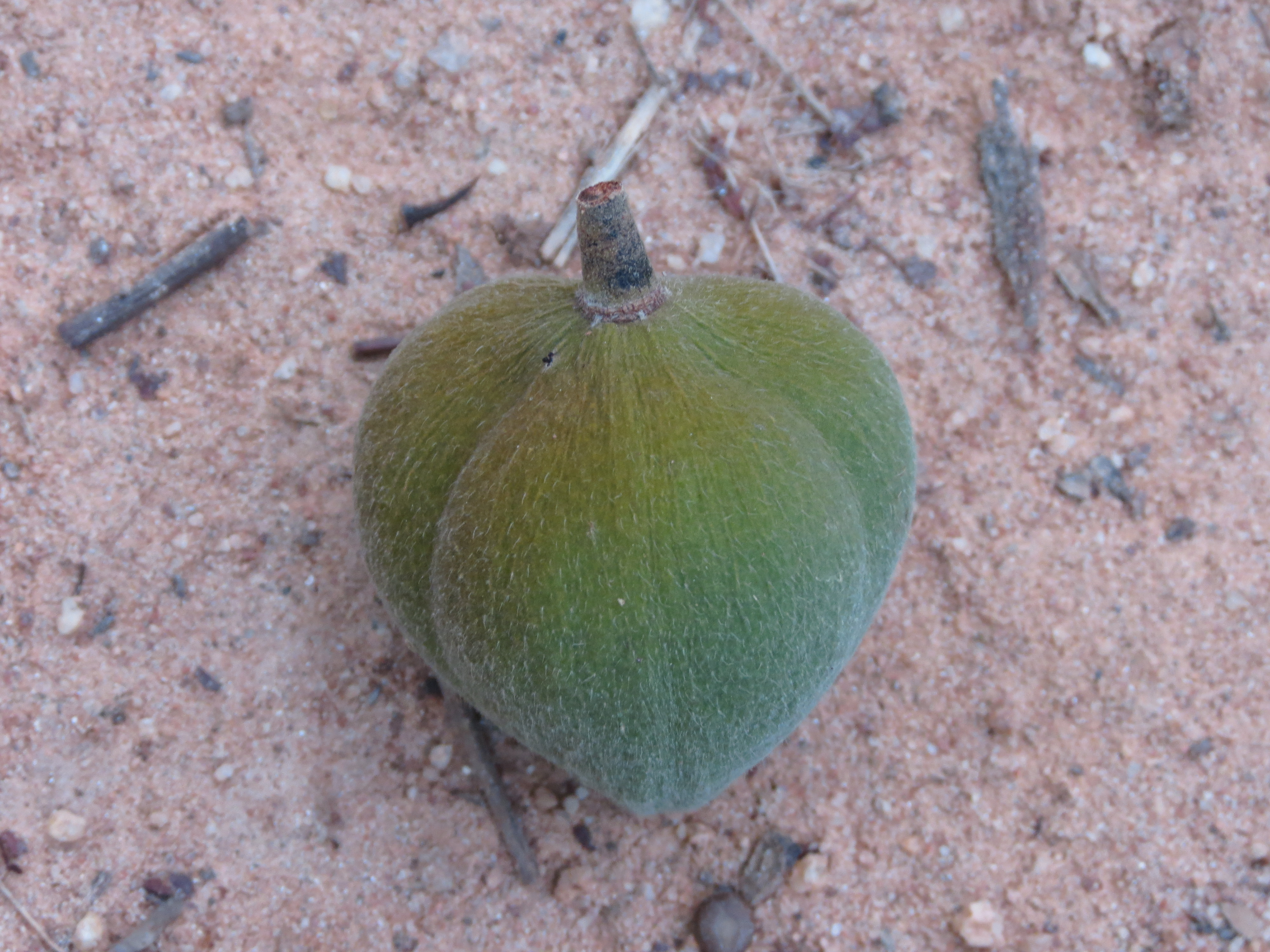
Reutealis trisperma

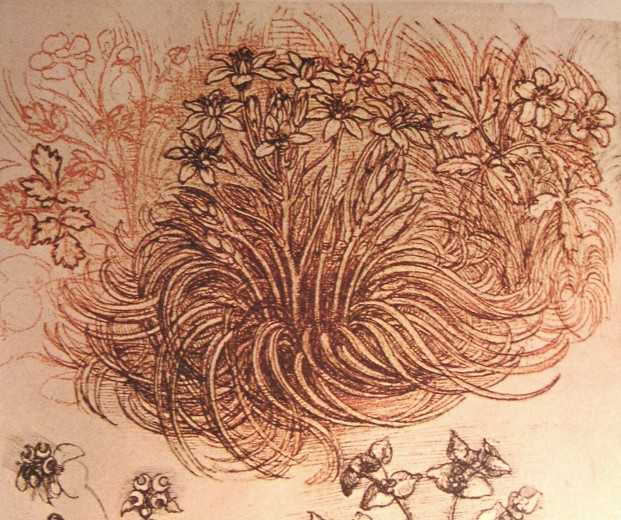
Da Vinci sketch of Ornithogalum umbellatum

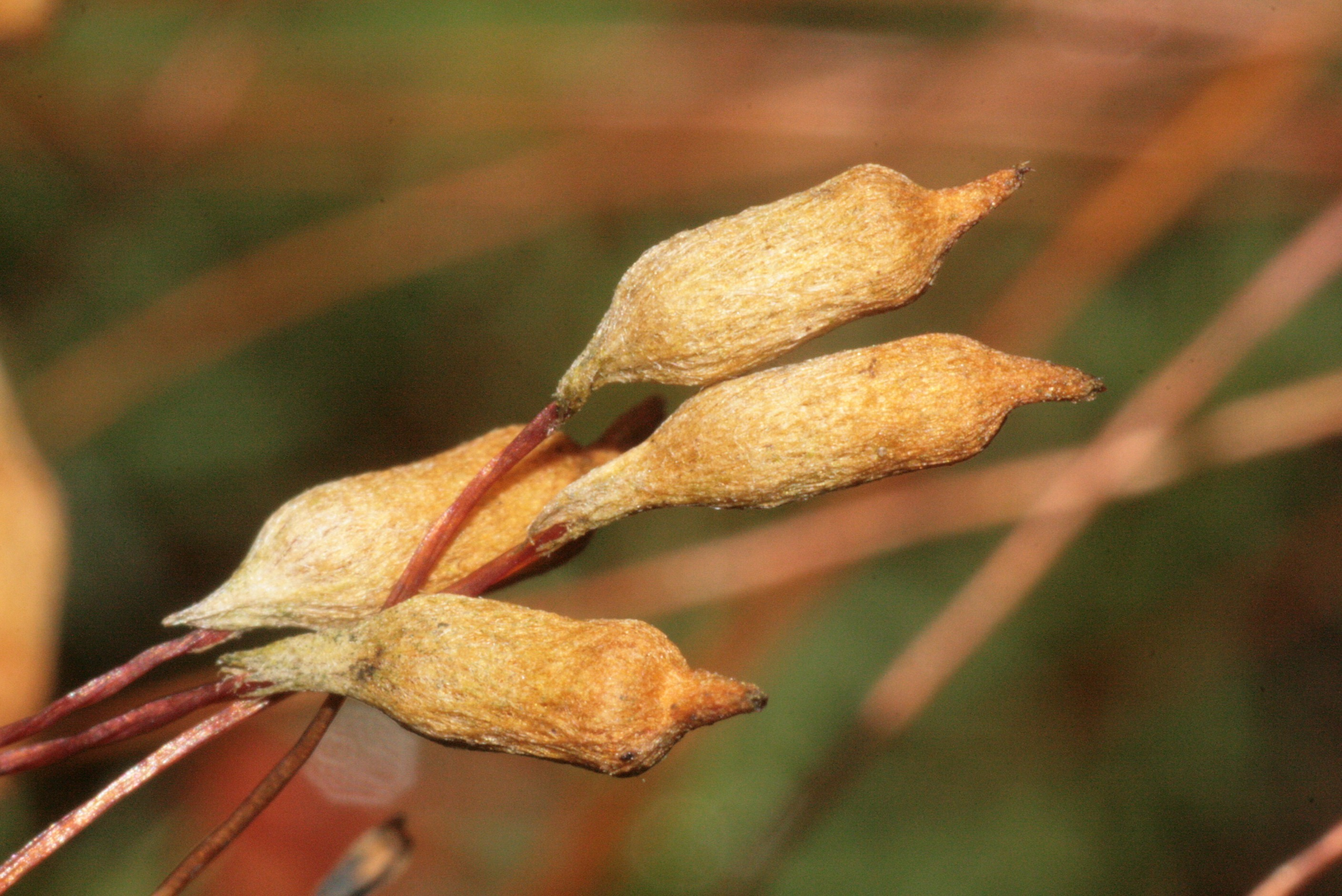
Pogonatum urnigerum

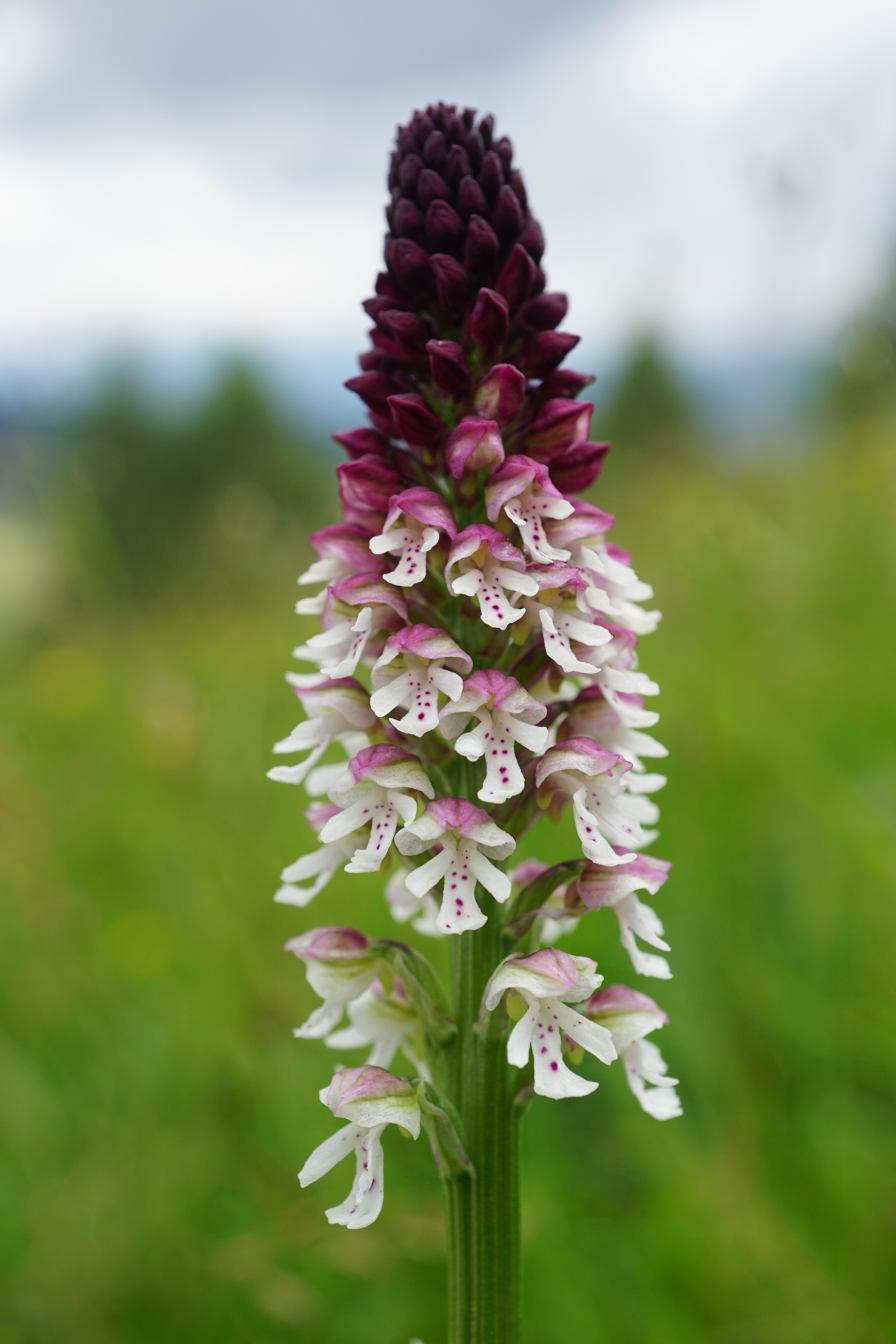
Neotinea ustulata

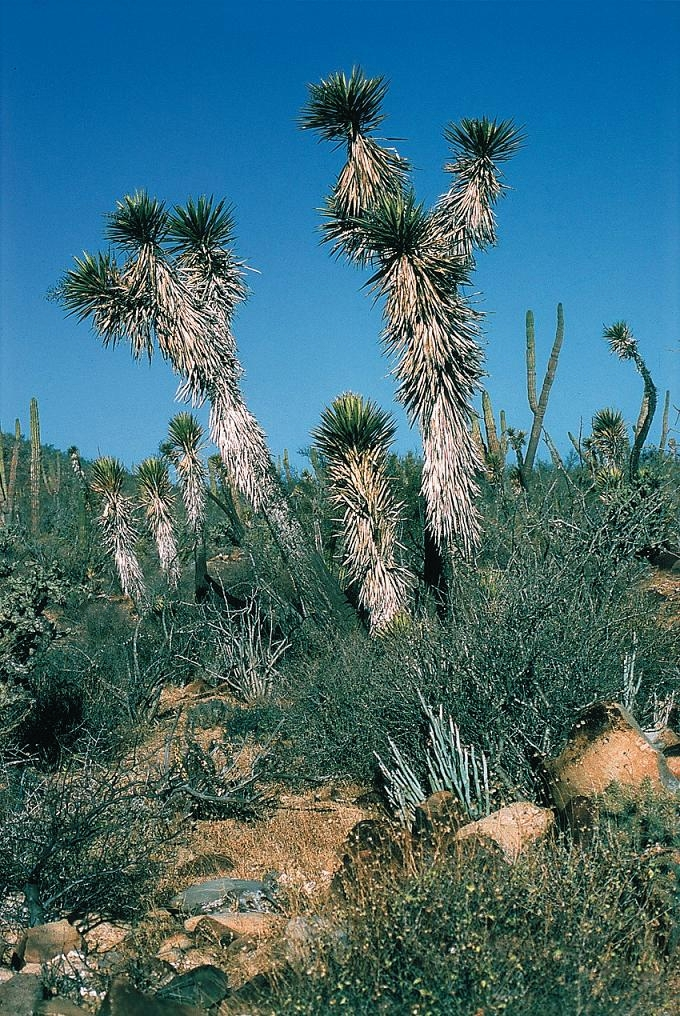
Yucca valida

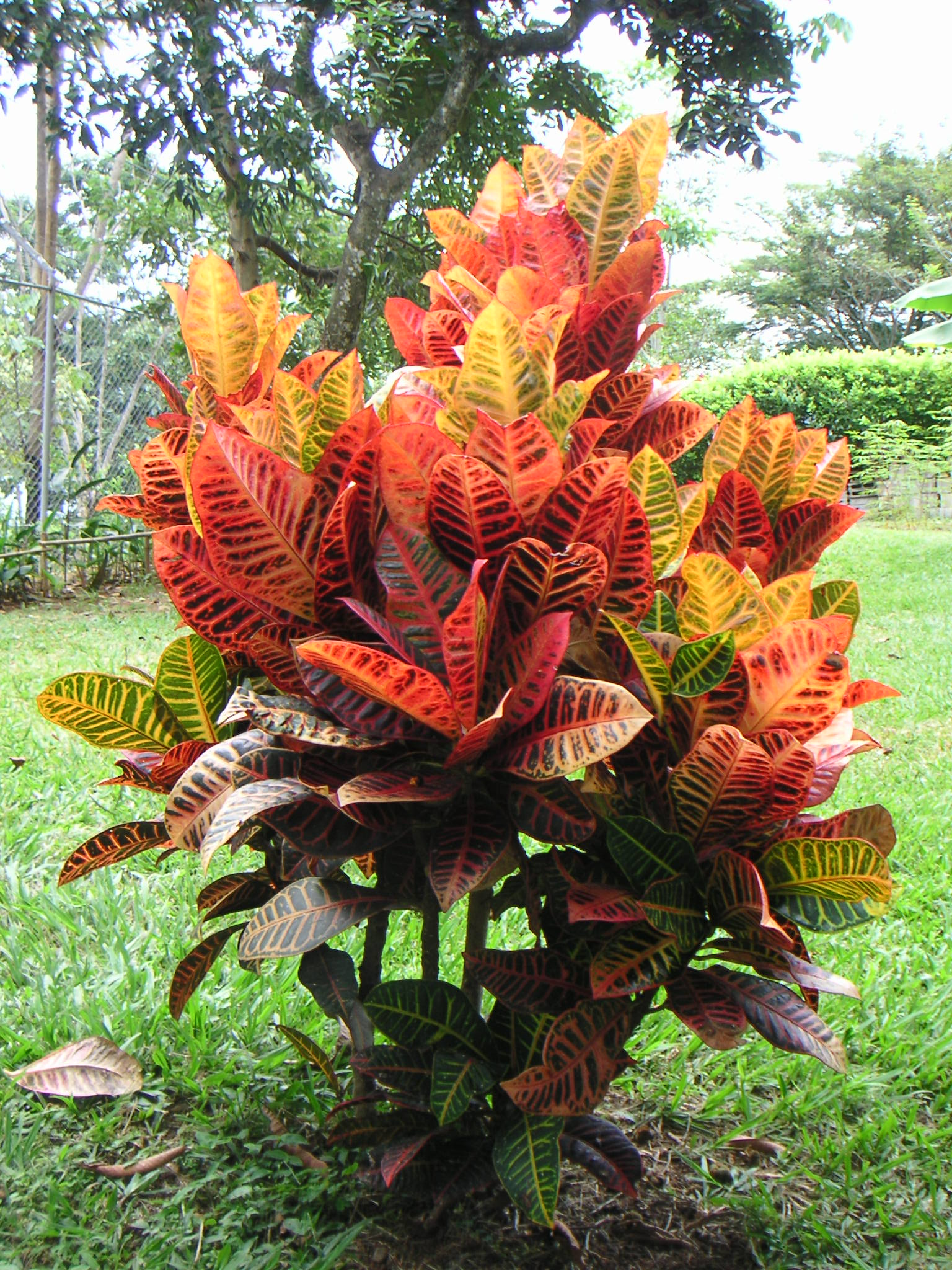
Codiaeum variegatum

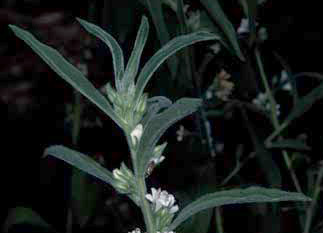
Myoporum velutinum

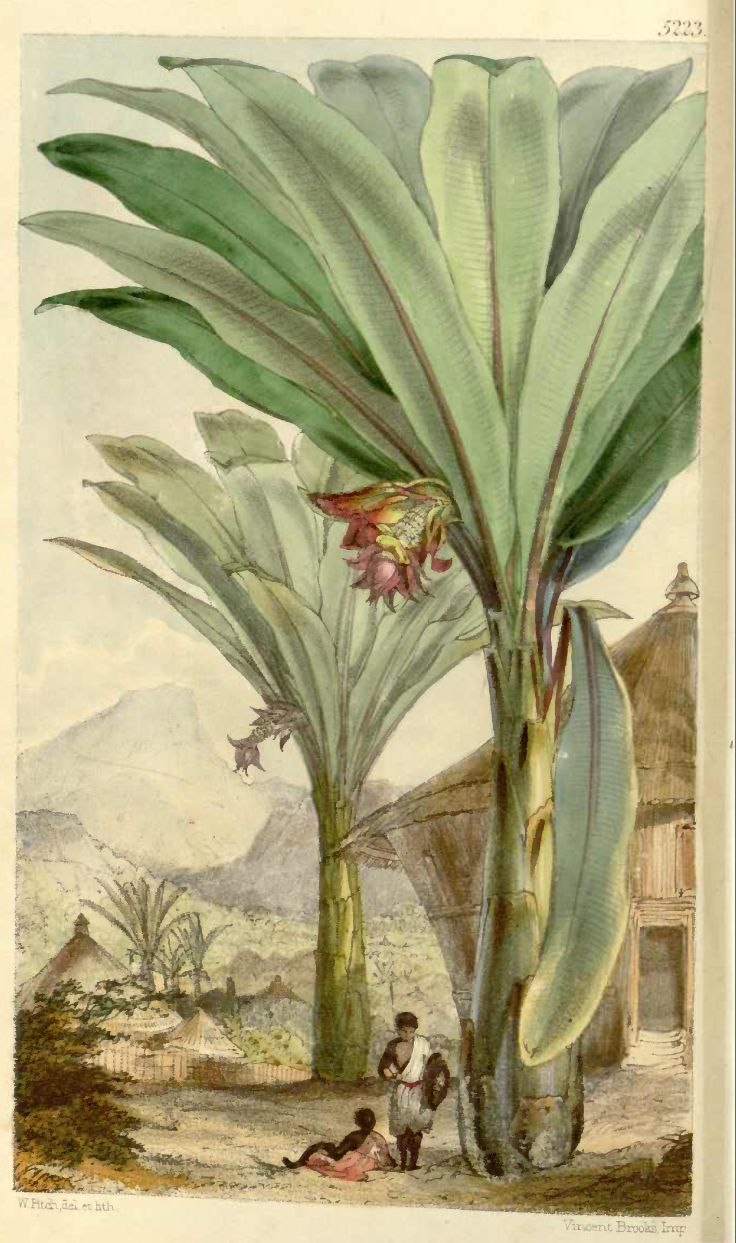
Painting of Ensete ventricosum

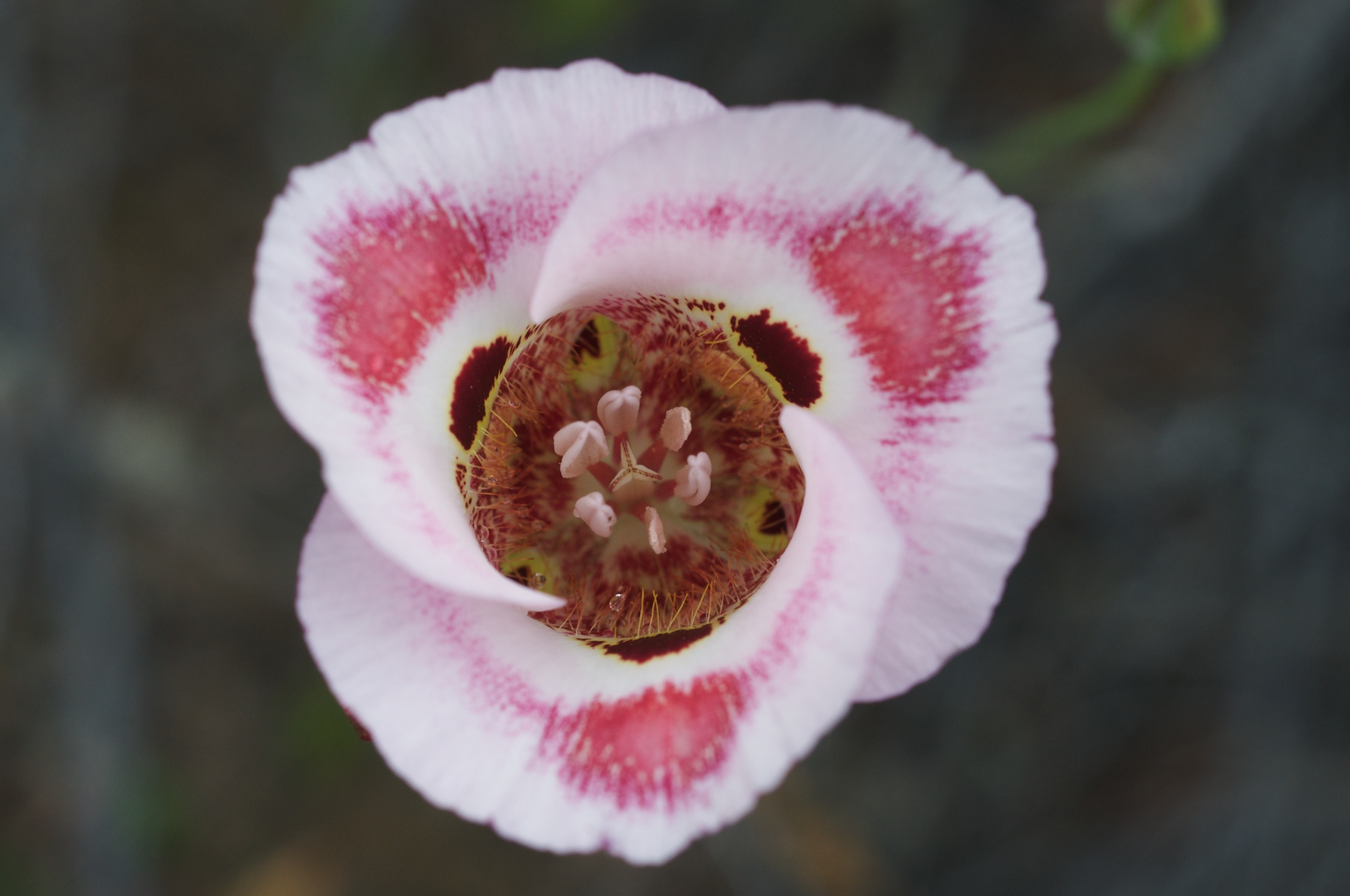
Calochortus venustus

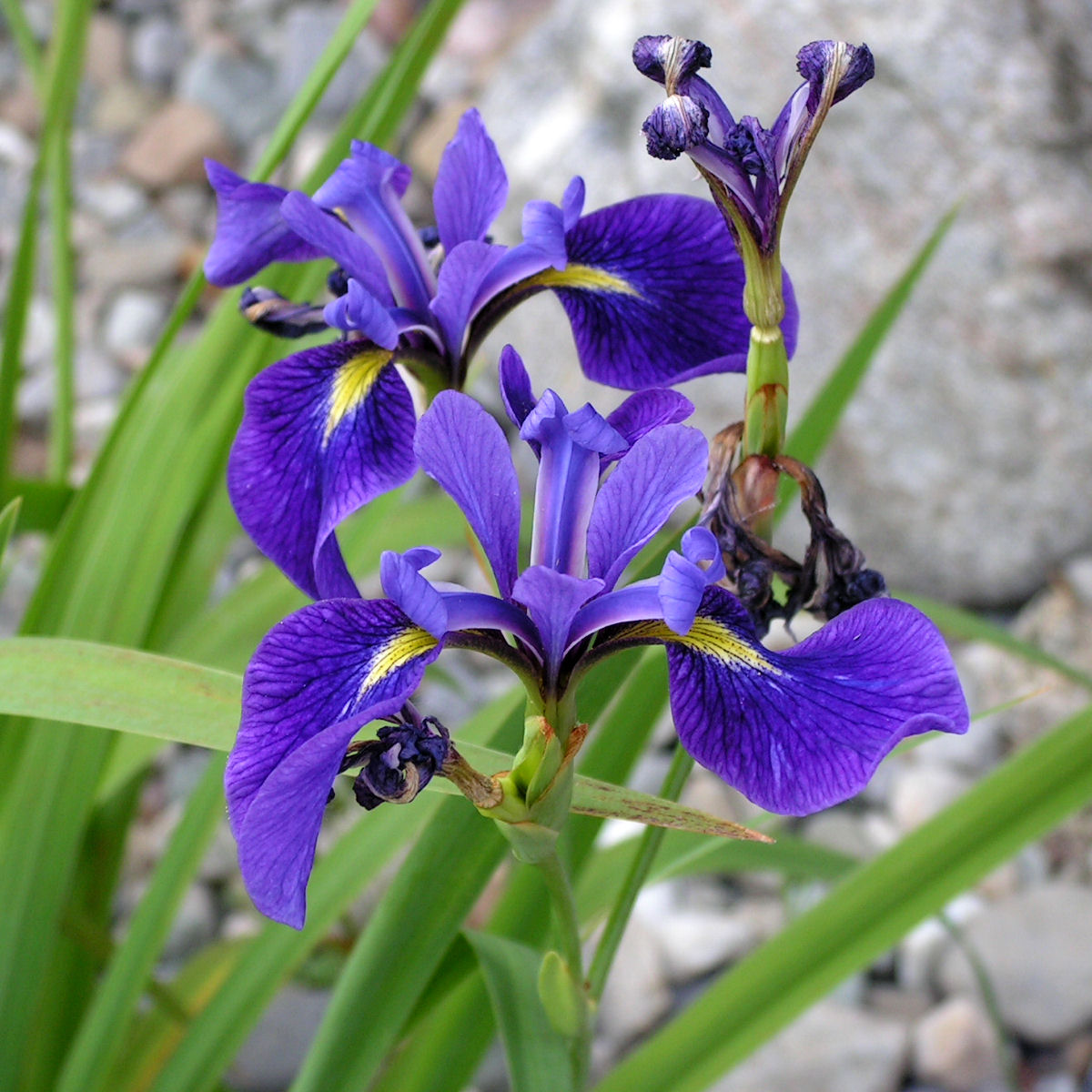
Iris versicolor

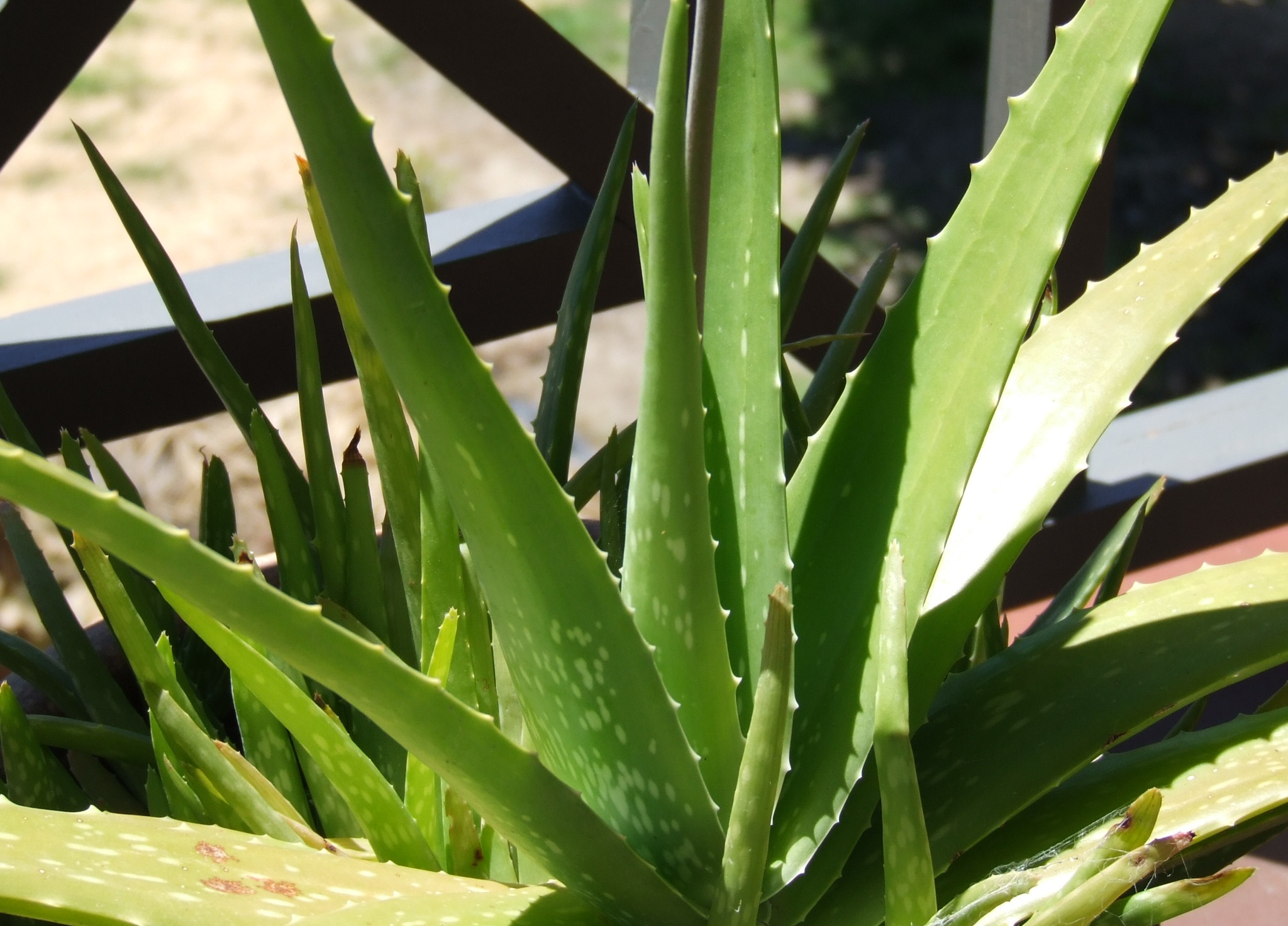
Aloe vera

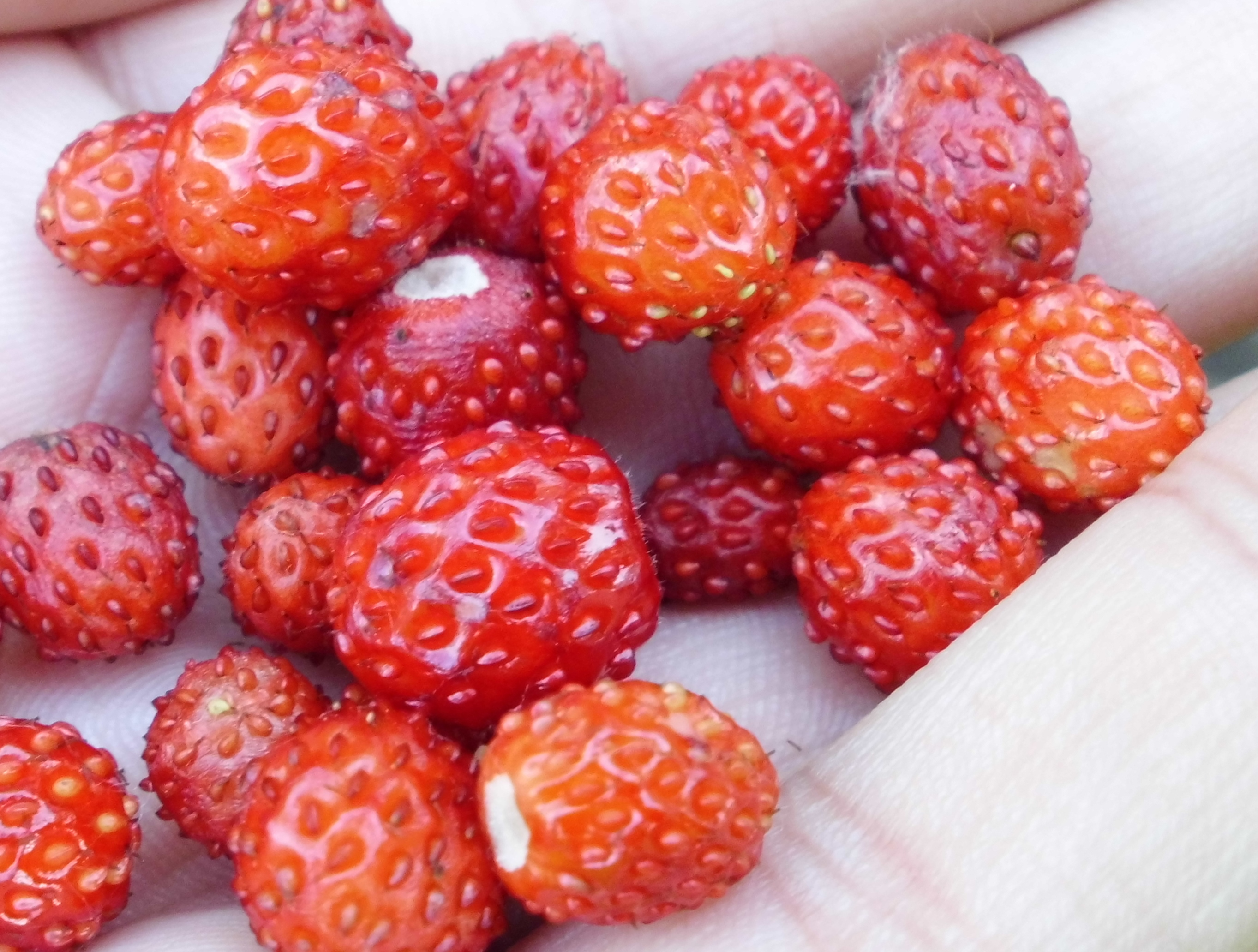
Fragaria vesca

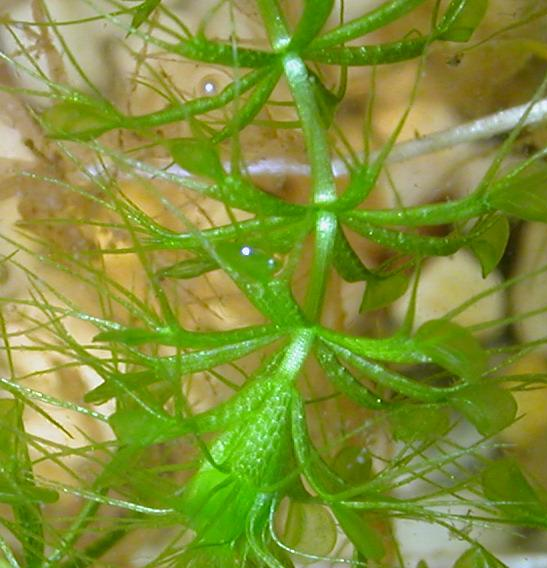
Aldrovanda vesiculosa

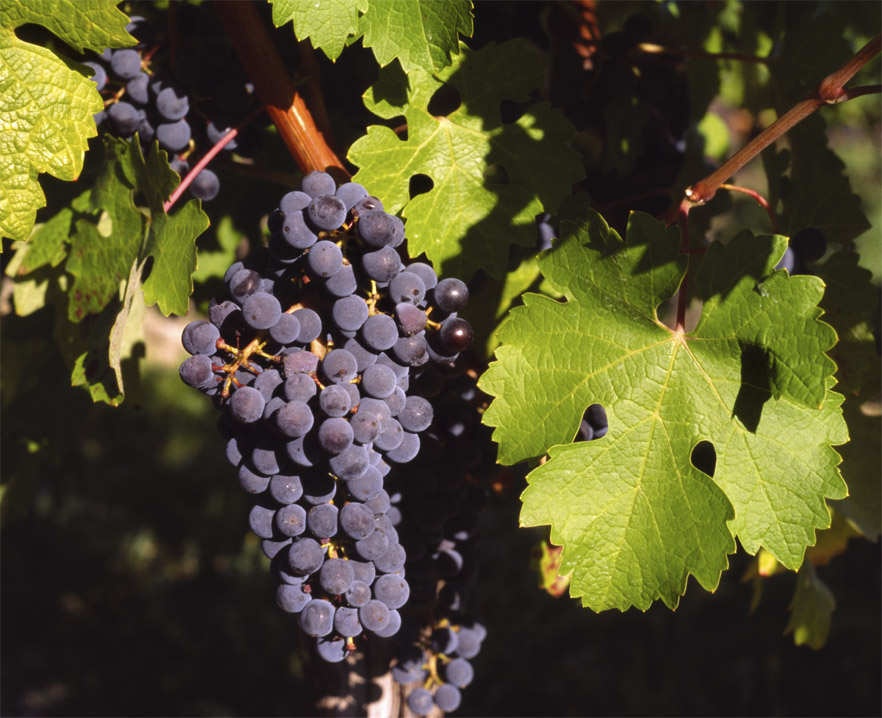
Vitis vinifera

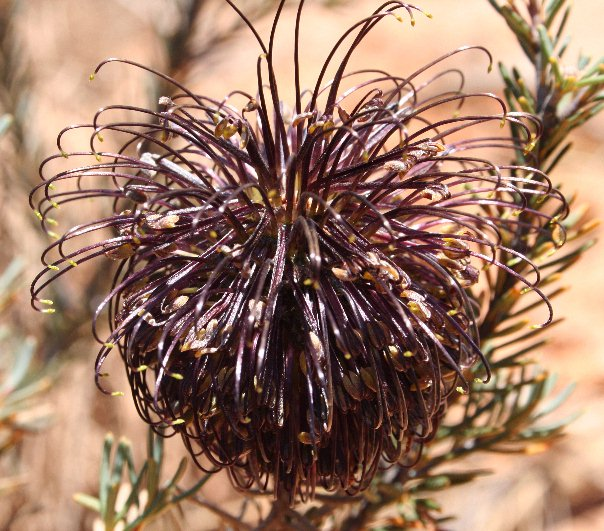
Banksia violacea

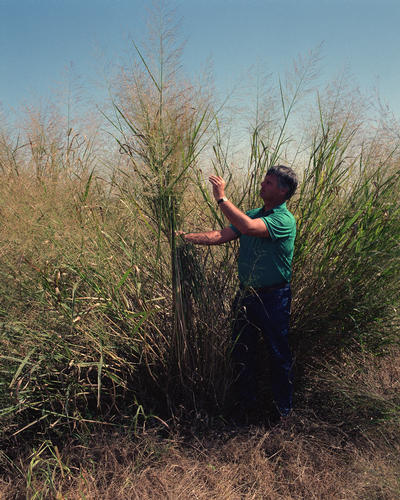
Panicum virgatum

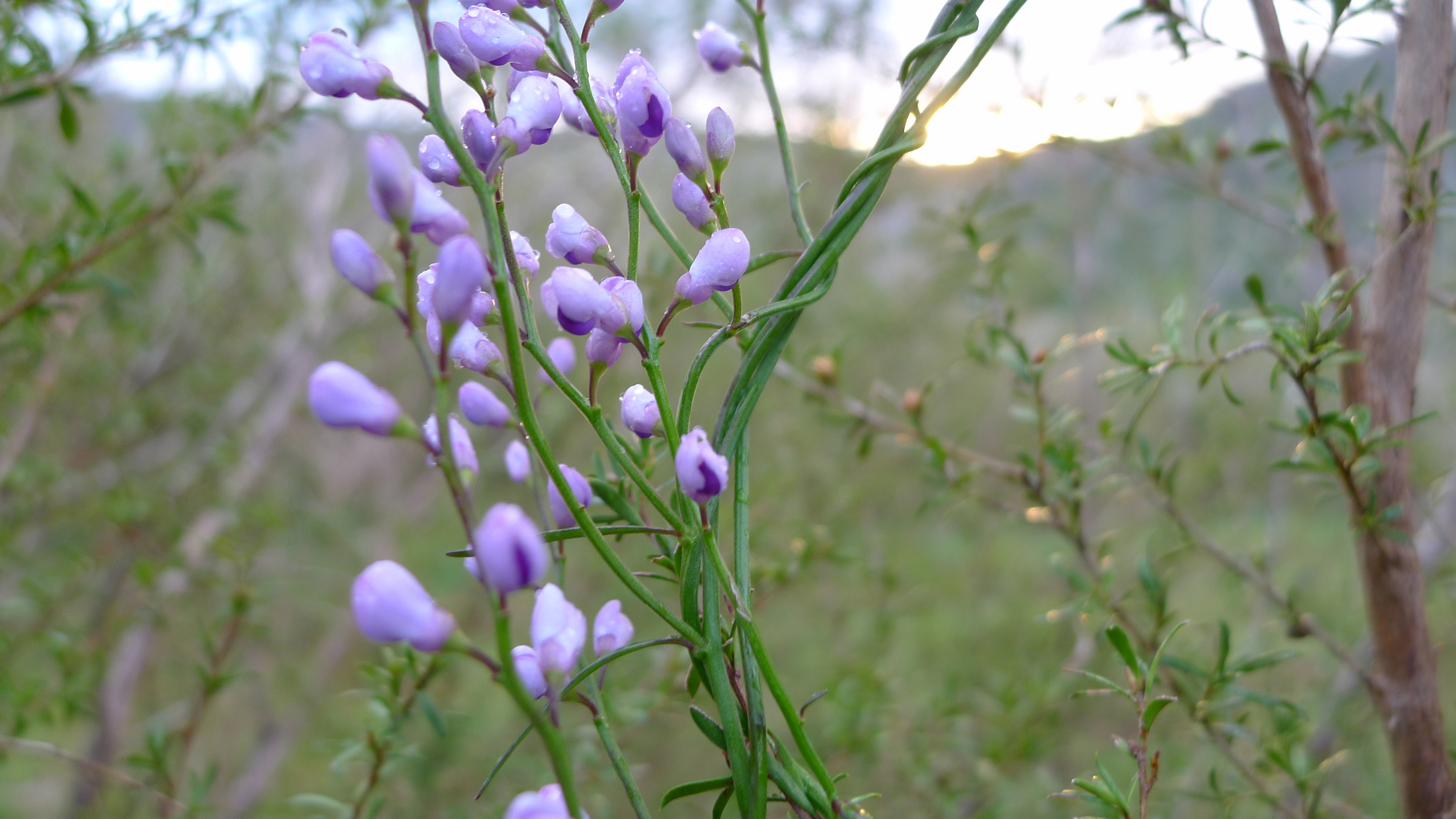
Comesperma volubile

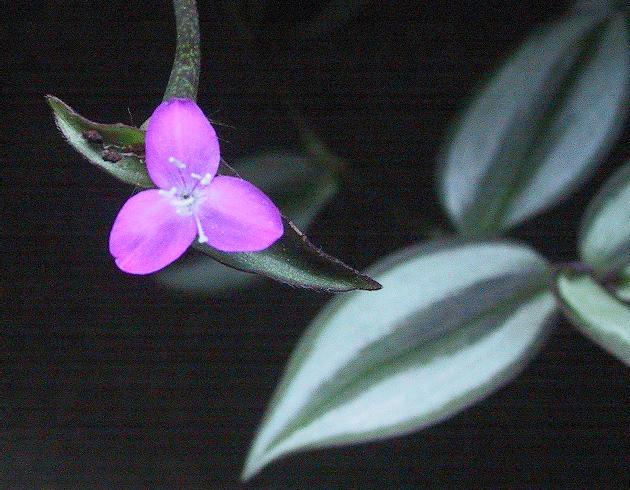
Tradescantia zebrina

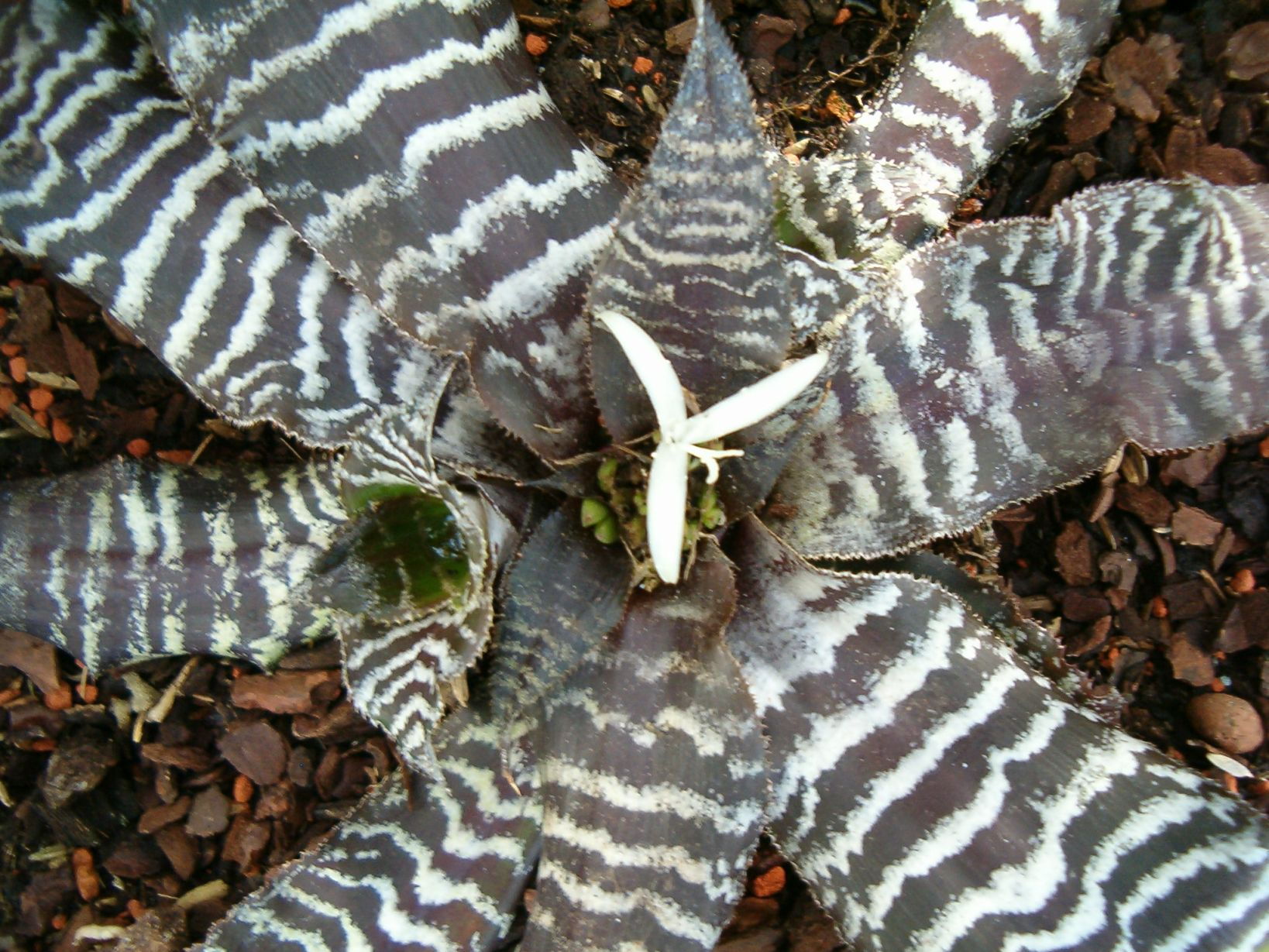
Cryptanthus zonatus

Epithets
Epithets (Note: Since all of the references cited in the table except Coombes arrange their species epithets alphabetically, citations with page numbers are provided only for Coombes, and each source in the table except for Coombes is always represented by the same superscript.)	LG	Meanings and derivations	Example species (Note: Red links for species are followed by an asterisk linking to the genus.)	H	DS	C
ianthinus	G	bluish-purple	Justicia ianthina		D	
icosandrus	G	twenty-stamened	Phytolacca icosandra	H	DS	
idoneus	L	worthy	Lupinus idoneus*		DS	
igneus	L	fiery red	Cuphea ignea, Heliconia ignescens*	H	DS	C
ignescens	L	fiery red	Cuphea ignea, Heliconia ignescens*	H	DS	
ignotus	L	(formerly) unknown	Tricalysia ignota*		DS	
illecebrosus	L	enticing, from illecebra	Tigridia illecebrosa*	H	DS	
illinitus	L	smeared, from lino, to smear	Escallonia illinita*	H	DS	
illustris	L	lustrous, from lustro, to illuminate	Ilex illustris	H	D	C
imbecillus	L	feeble	Agrostis imbecilla*		DS	
imbecillis	L	feeble	Agrostis imbecilla*		DS	
imberbis	L	unbearded	Combretum imberbe	H	DS	
imbricatus	L	overlapping, from imbrex, gutter tile; imbricate. (Also imbricans, imbricarius.)	Cylindropuntia imbricata	H	DS	C
immaculatus	L	immaculate, from macula, stain	Dicerandra immaculata	H	DS	
immersus	L	immersed	Navia immersa	H	DS	
impeditus	L	impeded	Tragia impedita*		DS	C
imperator	L	war leader; emperor	Fritillaria imperialis, Epidendrum imperator*		D	
imperialis	L	war leader; emperor	Fritillaria imperialis, Epidendrum imperator*	H	D	C
implexus	L	interwoven	Acacia implexa	H	DS	
impressus	L	engraved; creased	Epacris impressa	H	DS	C
impudicus	L	impudent	Heliconia impudica		DS	
inaequalis	L	unequal	Dryopteris inaequalis	H	DS	
inapertus	L	closed, from apertus	Agapanthus inapertus		DS	C
incanus	L	grey-haired	Matthiola incana	H	DS	C
incarnatus	L	peach-coloured, from caro, flesh	Asclepias incarnata	H	DS	C
incertus	L	uncertain	Penstemon incertus	H	DS	
incisus	L	cut deeply; incised	Urtica incisa	H	DS	C
inclaudens	L	not closing	Esterhuysenia inclaudens*	H		
inclinatus	L	inclined	Bulbophyllum inclinatum	H	DS	
incomparabilis	L	incomparable, from comparabilis	Stapelia incomparabilis*	H	DS	
incomptus	L	unkempt	Blakea incompta	H	D	
inconspicuus	L	inconspicuous, from conspicuus	Trithuria inconspicua	H	DS	
incrassatus	L	stout, from crassus, thick	Eucalyptus incrassata	H	DS	
incurvus	L	bowed; incurved	Corybas incurvus, Dacryodes incurvata	H	DS	C
incurvatus	L	bowed; incurved	Corybas incurvus, Dacryodes incurvata	H	DS	
indivisus	L	undivided, from divido	Cordyline indivisa	H	DS	
induratus	L	hardened	Eucalyptus indurata	H	DS	
inebrians	L	intoxicating, from inebrio	Lagochilus inebrians	H	D	
inermis	L	unarmed	Nepenthes inermis	H	DS	C
infaustus	L	unfortunate	Vangueria infausta	H	D	
infectorius	L	tinted, from infector, dyer	Quercus infectoria	H	D	
infestus	L	troublesome	Adolphia infesta*	H	DS	
inflatus	L	swollen; inflated	Eriogonum inflatum, Utricularia inflata	H	DS	C
inflexus	L	bowed; inflexed	Utricularia inflexa		DS	
infortunatus	L	unfortunate	Clerodendrum infortunatum	H	D	
infractus	L	bent, from frango, to fracture	Hypolobus infractus	H	DS	
infundibuliformis	L	funnel-shaped. (Also infundibulus.) (Note: The suffix -ulus and other diminutives can mean, among other things, "little" or "a little"; the exact meanings are beyond the scope of this list.)	Crossandra infundibuliformis	H	DS	
ingens	L	huge	Euphorbia ingens	H	DS	
innominatus	L	uncelebrated, from nominatus; nameless	Iris innominata		DS	
innoxius	L	harmless. (Also inoxius.)	Datura innoxia		DS	
inodorus	L	unscented, from odorus	Tripleurospermum inodorum	H	DS	
inopinus	L	unexpected	Encephalartos inopinus		D	
inornatus	L	plain	Boronia inornata	H	D	
inquinans	L	stained, from inquino	Pelargonium inquinans	H	D	
inscriptus	L	inscribed	Calathea inscripta*		D	
insignis	L	significant	Nepenthes insignis	H	DS	C
insipidus	L	insipid, from sapio	Ficus insipida		DS	
insititius	L	grafted, from insitio, a grafting	Prunus insititia	H	DS	
insulanus	L	island	Alsophila insulana, Digitaria insularis	H	D	
insularis	L	island	Alsophila insulana, Digitaria insularis	H	DS	
intactus	L	intact	Anthurium intactum*		DS	
intaminatus	L	uncontaminated	Cyclamen intaminatum		D	
integer	L	undivided; entire. Feminine integra, neuter integrum.	Artocarpus integer, Ochna integerrima	H	DS	C
integerrimus	L	undivided; entire. Feminine integra, neuter integrum.	Artocarpus integer, Ochna integerrima		DS	C
intermedius	L	intermediate, from medium, middle	Thinopyrum intermedium	H	DS	C
interruptus	L	gapped	Salvia interrupta	H	DS	
intertextus	L	interwoven	Eucalyptus intertexta	H	D	
intortus	L	contorted, from intorqueo	Acacia intorta	H	DS	
intricatus	L	entangled	Dipterocarpus intricatus	H	DS	
introrsus	L	turned inwards; introrse	Endiandra introrsa		DS	
intumescens	L	tumescent, from intumesco	Acrocomia intumescens	H	DS	
inundatus	L	inundated, from inundo	Lycopodiella inundata		DS	
inutilis	L	useless	Allium inutile		D	
inversus	L	inverted	Astragalus inversus	H	DS	
invisus	L	unseen	Silene invisa		D	
involucratus	L	enveloped, from involucrum, wrapper; involucred	Davidia involucrata	H	DS	C
involutus	L	rolled up, from involvo; involute	Bulbophyllum involutum	H	DS	
involvens	L	wrapping-around	Utricularia involvens		DS	
ionanthus	G	violet-coloured flowers	Streptocarpus ionanthus	H	DS	
iridescens	L	iridescent, from iris, rainbow	Caladenia iridescens	H	D	
irrasus	L	unshaven, from rasus	Grevillea irrasa		D	
irregularis	L	not symmetric, from regula, rule; irregular	Polygala irregularis	H	DS	
irriguus	L	irrigated; wet	Stellaria irrigua	H	DS	
irritans	L	irritating, from irrito	Triodia irritans		D	
irroratus	L	besprinkled, from irroro	Acacia irrorata		D	
isophyllus	G	even-leaved	Campanula isophylla	H	DS	C
ixocarpus	G	sticky-fruited	Indigofera ixocarpa*	H	D	
jejunus	L	meagre; small (Note: "j" was always written as "i" in Classical Latin.)	Salix jejuna	H		
jubatus	L	crested; awned	Hordeum jubatum	H	DS	C
jucundus	L	joyful; pleasant	Conophytum jucundum	H	D	C
jugalis	L	yoked	Melicope jugosa, Psychotria jugalis	H	D	
jugosus	L	yoked	Melicope jugosa, Psychotria jugalis	H	D	
julaceus	L	cylindrical, like some catkins	Anomobryum julaceum	H	S	
junceus	L	made of rushes; rush-like	Psathyrostachys juncea	H	DS	C
juvenilis	L	young	Carex juvenilis*	H	S	
kermesinus	L	crimson, from Arabic and Latin	Portea kermesina	H	DS	
labiatus	L	lipped, from labium, lip	Cattleya labiata, Zygosepalum labiosum	H	DS	
labiosus	L	lipped, from labium, lip	Cattleya labiata, Zygosepalum labiosum	H	DS	
labilis	L	labile, from labo, to totter or slip	Celtis labilis*	H	D	
lacerus	L	jagged, from lacer, lacerated. Stearn's spelling is lacer.	Spiranthes lacera, Calanthe lacerata*	H	DS	
laceratus	L	jagged, from lacer, lacerated. Stearn's spelling is lacer.	Spiranthes lacera, Calanthe lacerata*		DS	
laciniatus	L	roughly segmented	Silphium laciniatum, Carya laciniosa	H	DS	C
laciniosus	L	roughly segmented	Silphium laciniatum, Carya laciniosa		DS	C
lacrimans	L	weeping, from lacrimo	Eucalyptus lacrimans	H	D	
lacteus	L	milky	Iris lactea, Hieracium lactescens	H	DS	C
lactescens	L	milky	Iris lactea, Hieracium lactescens		D	
lactifer	L	milk; with milky sap (Note: Harrison and Bayton often list -ferus in place of -fer and -gerus in place of -ger.)	Gymnema lactiferum	H	DS	
lacunosus	L	full of hollows	Ipomoea lacunosa	H	DS	
lacustris	L	lake, from lacus	Iris lacustris	H	DS	C
laetus	L	joyful; bright	Myoporum laetum	H	DS	
laevis	L	smooth	Hibiscus laevis, Echinacea laevigata	H	DS	C
laevigatus	L	smooth	Hibiscus laevis, Echinacea laevigata	H		C
lamellatus	L	layered, from lamina, a thin sheet; lamellate	Leptospermum lamellatum	H	DS	
lanatus	L	woolly	Citrullus lanatus	H	DS	C
lanceus	L	lance, from lancea	Searsia lancea	H	D	
lanceolatus	L	lanceolate	Persoonia lanceolata	H	DS	C
laniger	L	fleecy	Leptospermum lanigerum, Myriopteris lanosa, Fraxinus lanuginosa	H	DS	C
lanosus	L	fleecy	Leptospermum lanigerum, Myriopteris lanosa, Fraxinus lanuginosa	H	DS	C
lanuginosus	L	fleecy	Leptospermum lanigerum, Myriopteris lanosa, Fraxinus lanuginosa	H	DS	C
lappa	L	with burrs. (Also lappaceus.)	Arctium lappa	H	DS	
lasiocarpus	G	woolly-fruited	Abies lasiocarpa		DS	C
latebrosus	L	with lurking-holes; concealing	Vexatorella latebrosa		D	
lateralis	L	lateral, from latus, side	Calothamnus lateralis	H	DS	
lateritius	L	brick-red, from later, brick	Melaleuca lateritia	H	DS	C
latifolius	L	broad-leaved, from latus, broad	Isopogon latifolius	H	DS	C
laudatus	L	laudible	Rhododendron laudandum*	H	D	
laudandus	L	laudible	Rhododendron laudandum*		D	
laxus	L	relaxed; lax	Freesia laxa	H	DS	C
leiocarpus	G	smooth-fruited	Angophora leiocarpa	H	DS	
lenticularis	L	lens; lenticular	Bossiaea lenticularis, Atriplex lentiformis		DS	
lentiformis	L	lens; lenticular	Bossiaea lenticularis, Atriplex lentiformis		DS	C
lentiginosus	L	spotted	Astragalus lentiginosus	H	DS	
lentus	L	pliant	Betula lenta	H	DS	C
leonis	L	lion, from leo. Neuter leonis.	Phacelia leonis	H	D	
leopardinus	G	spotted	Bulbophyllum leopardinum	H	D	
lepidotus	G	scaly	Andesanthus lepidotus		DS	
lepidus	L	elegant	Lupinus lepidus	H	D	
leptophyllus	G	slender-leaved	Banksia leptophylla	H	DS	C
leucanthus	G	white-flowered	Stenomesson leucanthum	H	DS	C
lignosus	L	woody, from lignum	Dipogon lignosus	H	DS	
ligularis	L	shoe-strap, from ligula; liguled	Passiflora ligularis, Schoenus ligulatus	H	D	
ligulatus	L	shoe-strap, from ligula; liguled	Passiflora ligularis, Schoenus ligulatus	H	DS	
limbatus	L	bordered, from limbus, border	Fissidens limbatus	H	DS	
limosus	L	muddy	Schoenus limosus	H	DS	
limnophilus	G	marsh-loving	Myriophyllum limnophilum*		DS	
linearis	L	linear	Persoonia linearis	H	DS	C
lineatus	L	lined	Iris lineata	H	DS	C
lingua	L	tongue	Pterostylis lingua	H	DS	C
linguiformis	L	tongue	Pterostylis lingua	H	DS	
lingulatus	L	tongue	Pterostylis lingua	H	DS	
lissocarpus	G	smooth-fruited	Synostemon lissocarpus*		D	
lithophilus	G	rock-loving	Isoetes lithophila*	H	DS	
littoralis	L	littoral, from litus, shore	Griselinia littoralis, Acacia littorea	H	DS	C
littoreus	L	littoral, from litus, shore	Griselinia littoralis, Acacia littorea	H	DS	
lividus	L	lead-coloured	Helleborus lividus	H	DS	C
lobatus	G	lobed	Quercus lobata	H	DS	C
lobulatus	G	lobed	Quercus lobata	H	D	
lochmius	G	thicket	Rhododendron lochmium*		D	
longus	L	long	Curcuma longa	H	DS	C
longissimus	L	longest	Dasylirion longissimum	H	DS	C
lophanthus	G	crested-flower	Paraserianthes lophantha	H	DS	
lucens	L	shining; clear. From luceo.	Potamogeton lucens	H	DS	
lucidus	L	shining; clear. From luceo.	Potamogeton lucens	H	D	C
lunatus	L	lunate	Phaseolus lunatus	H	DS	C
lunulatus	L	lunate	Phaseolus lunatus	H	DS	
luridus	L	greyish-yellow	Pelargonium luridum	H	DS	
luteus	L	yellow	Gentiana lutea	H	DS	C
luteolus	L	light yellow	Iris lutescens	H	DS	
lutescens	L	light yellow	Iris lutescens		DS	C
luxurians	L	luxuriant, from luxurio	Araucaria luxurians	H	DS	C
lyratus	L	lyre, from lyra; lyrate	Arabidopsis lyrata		DS	C
lysistemon	G	loose-stamened	Erythrina lysistemon		D	
macilentus	L	gaunt, from macies	Archaeopteris macilenta	H	DS	
macrophyllus	G	big-leaved	Ficus macrophylla	H	DS	C
maculosus	L	spotted	Flindersia maculosa	H	DS	C
maculatus	L	spotted	Flindersia maculosa	H	DS	C
maculifer	L	spotted	Flindersia maculosa		D	
magnificus	L	magnificent	Cercidiphyllum magnificum	H	D	C
magnus	L	big	Crateva magna	H	DS	
major	L	bigger. Stearn also lists majus. From maior, neuter maius.	Plantago major	H	DS	C
majalis	L	(flowering in) May, from Maius	Convallaria majalis	H	D	C
majesticus	L	majestic, from maiestas	Brillantaisia majestica*		D	
malacoides	G	soft	Eremophila malacoides	H	D	
mammillaris	L	nippled, from mamilla	Mammillaria mammillaris, Erica mammosa	H	D	
mammiformis	L	nippled, from mamilla	Mammillaria mammillaris, Erica mammosa		DS	
mammillatus	L	nippled, from mamilla	Mammillaria mammillaris, Erica mammosa	H	DS	
mammosus	L	nippled, from mamilla	Mammillaria mammillaris, Erica mammosa	H	DS	
manicatus	L	long-sleeved	Gunnera manicata	H	DS	C
manipuliflorus	L	with small bundles of flowers, from manipulus, a handful	Erica manipuliflora		DS	
margaritaceus	L	pearly, from margarita	Anaphalis margaritacea	H	DS	C
margaritus	L	pearly, from margarita	Anaphalis margaritacea	H	D	
margaritifer	L	pearly, from margarita	Anaphalis margaritacea	H	D	
marginalis	L	bordered, from margino	Banksia marginata	H	DS	C
marginatus	L	bordered, from margino	Banksia marginata	H	DS	C
marginellus	L	bordered, from margino	Banksia marginata		D	
maritimus	L	maritime	Pancratium maritimum	H	DS	C
marmoreus	L	marble	Sempervivum marmoreum, Kalanchoe marmorata	H	DS	C
marmoratus	L	marble	Sempervivum marmoreum, Kalanchoe marmorata	H	DS	
mas	L	with masculine qualities	Cornus mas	H	DS	C
masculus	L	with masculine qualities	Cornus mas	H	DS	
matronalis	L	matronly	Hesperis matronalis		D	C
maxillaris	L	jaw, from maxilla	Bulbophyllum maxillare	H	D	
maximus	L	biggest. (Also max.)	Heracleum maximum	H	DS	C
medicus	L	medicinal	Citrus medica	H	DS	C
medius	L	medium or middle	Campanula medium	H	DS	C
medullaris	L	pithy, from medulla, marrow	Sphaeropteris medullaris	H	D	
medullus	L	pithy, from medulla, marrow	Sphaeropteris medullaris	H	D	
megacarpus	G	with big fruit	Schoenus megacarpus	H	DS	
megalophyllus	G	with big leaves	Muniria megalophylla	H	DS	C
megeratus	G	very lovely	Rhododendron megeratum*		D	
meiacanthus	G	little-spined	Mammillaria meiacantha*		DS	
melancholicus	L	melancholy	Besleria melancholica*		DS	
melanoxylon	G	with black wood	Acacia melanoxylon	H	S	
mellitus	L	honey	Navarretia mellita	H	DS	
melleus	L	honey	Navarretia mellita		DS	
mellifer	L	honey	Navarretia mellita	H	D	C
melliodorus	L	honey-scented. Stearn also lists meliodorus.	Eucalyptus melliodora	H	D	
meloformis	L	melon-shaped	Euphorbia meloformis	H	D	
membranaceus	L	membranous, from membrana	Scadoxus membranaceus	H	DS	
meniscifolius	L	crescent-leaved	Serpocaulon meniscifolium*	H	DS	
meridianus	L	(flowering at) midday; southern	Caladenia meridionalis	H	D	
meridionalis	L	(flowering at) midday; southern	Caladenia meridionalis	H	DS	C
metallicus	L	metal, from metallum	Calochilus metallicus	H	DS	C
micans	L	sparkling	Shorea micans		DS	
micranthus	G	small-flowered	Eremophila micrantha	H	DS	C
militaris	L	military	Orchis militaris	H	D	
millefolius	L	thousand-leaved, from mille	Potentilla millefolia	H	DS	C
mimetes	G	mimic	Senecio mimetes*		D	
minax	L	menacing	Bulbophyllum minax		D	
miniatus	L	red-tinged	Aechmea miniata	H	DS	C
minimus	L	smallest	Salvinia minima	H	DS	C
minor	L	smaller. Stearn also lists minus. From minor, neuter minus.	Vinca minor	H	DS	C
minutus	L	minute	Marsilea minuta	H	DS	
minutissimus	L	minutest	Bulbophyllum minutissimum	H	D	
mirabilis	L	amazing	Nepenthes mirabilis	H	D	C
mitis	L	gentle	Caryota mitis	H	DS	
mitratus	L	turbaned	Blepharis mitrata	H	D	
mitriformis	L	turbaned	Blepharis mitrata	H	DS	
mixtus	L	hybrid; mixed	Passiflora mixta	H	DS	
modestus	L	modest	Carpobrotus modestus	H	D	C
mollis	L	soft	Leymus mollis	H	DS	C
mollissimus	L	softest	Castanea mollissima	H	D	C
monilifer	L	necklace, from monile	Allocasuarina monilifera, Consolea moniliformis	H	D	
moniliformis	L	necklace, from monile	Allocasuarina monilifera, Consolea moniliformis	H	DS	
monogynus	G	single-ovaried	Crataegus monogyna	H	DS	C
monstrosus	L	monstrous, from monstruosus	Aegiphila monstrosa	H	DS	
montanus	L	mountain. (Also montensis.)	Asplenium montanum, Acacia monticola	H	DS	C
monticola	L	mountain. (Also montensis.)	Asplenium montanum, Acacia monticola	H	D	
montigenus	L	mountain. (Also montensis.)	Asplenium montanum, Acacia monticola	H	D	
moschatus	G	musky	Cucurbita moschata	H	DS	C
mucosus	L	slimy, from mucus, mucus	Euryops mucosus	H	DS	
mucronatus	L	sharp-edged, from mucro, sword-point or edge; mucronate	Ziziphus mucronata	H	DS	C
mucronulatus	L	short-pointed	Grevillea mucronulata	H	D	C
multifidus	L	divided into many parts	Leucospora multifida	H	DS	C
mundulus	L	elegant, from mundus	Hackelia mundula	H	D	
muralis	L	wall	Cymbalaria muralis	H	DS	C
musaicus	L	mosaic. Stearn also lists mosaicus.	Guzmania musaica	H	DS	
muscitoxicus	L	toxic to flies	Amianthium muscitoxicum		D	
muscivorus	L	fly-eating, from voro	Helicodiceros muscivorus	H	D	
muscosus	L	mossy	Crassula muscosa	H	DS	
muscoides	L	mossy	Crassula muscosa	H	D	
mutabilis	L	mutable	Hibiscus mutabilis	H	DS	C
mutatus	L	changed	Apoballis mutata*	H	DS	
mutilatus	L	mutilated; blunt. From mutilus.	Cirsium muticum	H	DS	
muticus	L	mutilated; blunt. From mutilus.	Cirsium muticum	H	DS	
myriophyllus	G	myriad-leaved	Pilea myriophylla	H	DS	
myrmecophilus	G	ant-loving	Hylaeaicum myrmecophila	H	DS	
nanus	L	dwarf	Boronia nana	H	DS	C
nanellus	L	dwarf	Boronia nana	H	D	
nasutus	L	large-nosed; scornful	Erythranthe nasuta		D	
natans	L	floating, from nato	Trapa natans	H	DS	
nauseosus	L	disgusting, from nauseo	Dypsis nauseosa	H	DS	
navicularis	L	boat-shaped, from navicula, a small boat	Micromyrtus navicularis	H	DS	C
nebulosus	L	cloudy	Eucalyptus nebulosa	H	DS	
neglectus	L	neglected	Stellaria neglecta	H	DS	C
nemorosus	L	forest	Anemonoides nemorosa	H	DS	C
nemoralis	L	forest	Anemonoides nemorosa	H	DS	C
nervosus	L	veined, originally from nervus	Liparis nervosa	H	DS	C
nervatus	L	veined, originally from nervus	Liparis nervosa		D	
nervis	L	veined, originally from nervus	Liparis nervosa	H	DS	
neurocarpus	G	veined-fruit	Acacia neurocarpa		D	
nictitans	L	blinking; moving	Chamaecrista nictitans	H	D	
nidus	L	nest	Asplenium nidus	H	DS	
niger	L	black. Feminine nigra, neuter nigrum.	Piper nigrum	H	DS	C
nigrescens	L	blackish, from nigresco	Pyrorchis nigricans	H	DS	
nigricans	L	blackish, from nigresco	Pyrorchis nigricans	H	DS	C
nigratus	L	blackish, from nigresco	Pyrorchis nigricans	H	D	
nitidus	L	shining	Calochortus nitidus	H	DS	C
nitens	L	shining	Calochortus nitidus	H	DS	
nivalis	L	snow	Galanthus nivalis	H	DS	C
niveus	L	snow	Galanthus nivalis	H	DS	C
nivosus	L	snow	Galanthus nivalis	H	DS	
nobilis	L	celebrated	Laurus nobilis	H	D	C
nocturnus	L	night	Cestrum nocturnum	H	DS	C
nodosus	L	knobby	Ficinia nodosa	H	DS	
nodulosus	L	knobby	Ficinia nodosa	H	DS	
non-scriptus	L	unmarked, from scriptus	Hyacinthoides non-scripta	H	D	C
notatus	L	marked	Paspalum notatum	H	DS	
nothus	G	false	Iris notha		DS	
nubigenus	L	high-altitude, from nubigena, cloud-born	Podocarpus nubigenus	H	D	C
nubicola	L	high-altitude, from nubigena, cloud-born	Podocarpus nubigenus	H	D	
nucifer	L	nut-bearing, from nux	Cocos nucifera	H	DS	
nudus	L	naked	Genoplesium nudum	H	DS	C
nudatus	L	naked	Genoplesium nudum	H	D	
nummularius	L	coin, from nummulus	Atriplex nummularia	H	D	C
nutans	L	nodding	Silene nutans	H	DS	C
nyctagineus	G	night-born (night-blooming)	Mirabilis nyctaginea	H	D	
obconicus	L	inverted cone, from conus	Eucalyptus obconica	H	DS	
obesus	L	fat	Adenium obesum	H	DS	
oblatus	L	oblate (round and slightly flattened). From latus, wide.	Syringa oblata	H	DS	
obliquus	L	slanting; oblique	Ficus obliqua	H	DS	C
obliteratus	L	erased, from oblitero; imperceptible	Nephrolepis obliterata		DS	
oblongus	L	oblong	Cydonia oblonga	H	DS	C
oblongatus	L	oblong	Cydonia oblonga	H	D	
obovatus	L	obovate (reversed ovate). From ovum, egg.	Adenanthos obovatus	H	DS	C
obscurus	L	obscure; dark	Dendrolycopodium obscurum	H	DS	C
obsoletus	L	shabby	Narcissus obsoletus		DS	
obtectus	L	covered; protected	Acacia obtecta	H	S	
obtusus	L	obtuse	Galium obtusum	H	DS	C
obtusatus	L	obtuse	Galium obtusum	H	DS	
obvallatus	L	fortified; walled	Geophila obvallata*	H	DS	
obvallaris	L	fortified; walled	Geophila obvallata*		D	C
occidentalis	L	western, from occidens	Platanus occidentalis	H	DS	C
occultus	L	hidden	Dalbergia occulta	H	S	
ocellatus	L	eyespot, from ocellus, little eye	Viola ocellata	H	DS	
ochraceus	G	ochre	Tabebuia ochracea	H	DS	C
octopetalus	L	eight-petalled, from octo	Dryas octopetala	H	DS	C
oculatus	L	eyespot, from oculus, eye	Verticordia oculata	H	D	
odoratus	L	fragrant	Lathyrus odoratus	H	DS	C
odorifer	L	fragrant	Lathyrus odoratus	H	DS	
odorus	L	fragrant	Lathyrus odoratus	H	DS	C
odoratissimus	L	most fragrant	Artocarpus odoratissimus	H	D	C
officinalis	L	medicinal (Note: The -um ending on officinarum denotes a genitive plural noun.)	Zingiber officinale	H	DS	C
officinarum	L	medicinal	Zingiber officinale	H	D	
oleifer	L	oil-bearing, from oleum, oil	Moringa oleifera	H	D	C
oleraceus	L	kitchen-garden, from olus	Sonchus oleraceus	H	DS	C
olitorius	L	kitchen-garden, from olus	Sonchus oleraceus	H	DS	
oligocarpus	G	with few fruits	Annona oligocarpa	H	DS	
olivaceus	L	green-brown, from oliva, olive	Lithops olivacea	H	DS	
opacus	L	darkened; in the shade	Ilex opaca	H	S	
operculatus	L	lidded, from operculum, a covering	Luffa operculata	H	S	
oporinus	G	autumn	Diuris oporina		D	
oppositifolius	L	opposite-leaved, from oppositus	Myoporum oppositifolium	H	DS	C
orbiculatus	L	circular, from orbis, ring; orbicular	Celastrus orbiculatus	H	DS	C
orbicularis	L	circular, from orbis, ring; orbicular	Celastrus orbiculatus	H	DS	
oreophilus	G	mountain	Sarracenia oreophila	H	DS	C
oresbius	G	mountain	Sarracenia oreophila	H	DS	
orgyalis	G	fathom-long	Kalanchoe orgyalis		DS	
orientalis	L	eastern, from oriens	Platanus orientalis	H	DS	C
ornatus	L	ornamented. (Also ornans.)	Musa ornata	H	DS	C
ornatissimus	L	most ornamented	Downingia ornatissima	H	D	
orthocarpus	G	straight-fruited	Acacia orthocarpa	H	DS	
osmanthus	G	fragrant-flowered	Attalea osmantha	H	DS	
ovatus	L	ovate, from ovum, egg	Trillium ovatum	H	DS	C
ovalis	L	ovate, from ovum, egg	Trillium ovatum	H	DS	
ovifer	L	egg-bearing, from ovum	Pachyphytum oviferum, Pandanus oviger*		D	
oviger	L	egg-bearing, from ovum	Pachyphytum oviferum, Pandanus oviger*		D	
ovinus	L	sheep, from ovis	Festuca ovina	H	DS	C
oxyphyllus	G	sharp-leaved	Melaleuca oxyphylla	H	DS	C
pabularis	L	fodder, from pabulum	Barleria pabularis*		DS	
pachycarpus	G	thick-fruited	Corymbia pachycarpa	H	DS	C
paganus	L	of villages	Rubus paganus	H		
pallidus	L	pale	Lycium pallidum	H	DS	C
pallens	L	pale	Lycium pallidum	H	DS	
pallescens	L	pale	Lycium pallidum	H	DS	
palmaris	L	palm's-width	Chromolaena palmaris*	H	DS	
palmatus	L	hand-shaped, from palma; palmate	Diplocyclos palmatus	H	DS	C
palustris	L	marsh, from palus	Banksia paludosa	H	DS	C
paludosus	L	marsh, from palus	Banksia paludosa	H	DS	
panduratus	L	fiddle-shaped; pandurate	Ipomoea pandurata	H	DS	
paniculatus	L	panicled	Toxicoscordion paniculatum	H	DS	C
pannosus	L	tattered	Cotoneaster pannosus	H	DS	
papilio	L	butterfly	Bulbophyllum papilio	H		
papillosus	L	papillose, from papilla, nipple	Sphagnum papillosum		DS	
papilliger	L	papillose, from papilla, nipple	Sphagnum papillosum		D	
papyraceus	L	paper. (Also papyrus.)	Narcissus papyraceus	H	DS	C
papyrifer	L	paper. (Also papyrus.)	Narcissus papyraceus	H	D	C
paradisiacus	G	paradise; garden	Cipura paradisiaca*	H	D	
paradisi	G	paradise; garden	Cipura paradisiaca*	H	D	
paradoxus	G	unusual	Dissocarpus paradoxus	H	D	C
parasiticus	L	parasitic, from parasitus	Macrosolen parasiticus	H	DS	
pardalinus	L	leopard, from pardus. (Also pardinus.)	Lilium pardalinum	H	D	C
parmulatus	L	shield, from parmula	Rhododendron parmulatum*		D	
partitus	L	divided	Klattia partita*	H	DS	
parvus	L	small	Camissonia parvula	H	DS	
parvulus	L	small	Camissonia parvula		D	C
pastoralis	L	of shepherds	Meryta pastoralis*		DS	
patellaris	L	dish, from patella	Eucalyptus patellaris		D	
patelliformis	L	dish, from patella	Eucalyptus patellaris		DS	
patens	L	spreading out	Physcomitrella patens	H	DS	C
patulus	L	spreading out	Physcomitrella patens	H	DS	C
pauciflorus	L	sparse-flowered, from paucus	Stephanomeria pauciflora	H	DS	C
pauperculus	L	poor	Astragalus pauperculus	H	D	
pavoninus	L	peacock blue, from pavo; eye-spotted	Anemone pavonina*	H	DS	C
pectinatus	L	comb, from pecten; pectinate	Echinocereus pectinatus	H	DS	C
pectinifer	L	comb, from pecten; pectinate	Echinocereus pectinatus		D	
pectoralis	L	chest, from pectus	Justicia pectoralis	H	D	
peculiaris	L	peculiar	Trachyandra peculiaris	H	S	
pedalis	L	foot-long	Indocalamus pedalis*		DS	
pedatifidus	L	bird's-foot; pedate. From pes, foot.	Viola pedatifida, Sidalcea pedata	H	D	C
pedatus	L	bird's-foot; pedate. From pes, foot.	Viola pedatifida, Sidalcea pedata	H	DS	C
pedunculosus	L	peduncled	Lotus pedunculatus	H	D	C
peduncularis	L	peduncled	Lotus pedunculatus	H	DS	
pedunculatus	L	peduncled	Lotus pedunculatus	H	DS	
pellucidus	L	transparent, from perlucidus; pellucid	Tetraphis pellucida	H	DS	
peltatus	L	shield-bearing; peltate	Pelargonium peltatum	H	DS	C
pelviformis	L	shallow, from pelvis, basin	Campanula pelviformis*	H	DS	
pendulus	L	hanging	Betula pendula	H	DS	C
pendulinus	L	hanging	Betula pendula	H	DS	C
penicillatus	L	paint-brush, from penicillus; penicillate. (Also penicillius.)	Banksia penicillata	H	DS	
peninsularis	L	peninsula, from peninsula	Argyrochosma peninsularis	H	DS	
pennatus	L	feathered; pinnate. From pinnatus.	Stipa pennata	H	DS	
penniger	L	feathered, from penna	Verticordia pennigera	H	D	
pensilis	L	hanging	Glyptostrobus pensilis	H	D	
pentaphyllus	G	five-leaved	Gynostemma pentaphyllum	H	DS	C
peramoenus	L	very pleasant	Platanthera peramoena		D	
perbellus	L	beautiful	Veronica perbella*	H	D	
percussus	L	perforated	Goniophlebium percussum*		D	
peregrinus	L	foreign	Comptonia peregrina	H	DS	C
perennis	L	year-long; perennial	Mercurialis perennis	H	DS	C
perennans	L	year-long; perennial	Mercurialis perennis		DS	
perfoliatus	L	perfoliate	Eupatorium perfoliatum	H	DS	C
perfossus	L	perfoliate	Eupatorium perfoliatum		DS	
perforatus	L	perforated, from perforo	Hypericum perforatum	H	DS	C
pergracilis	L	very slender, from gracilis	Psydrax pergracilis	H	D	
permixtus	L	intermingled	Rubus permixtus		D	
persimilis	L	very similar	Crataegus persimilis		D	C
persistens	L	persisting, from persisto	Calochortus persistens	H	DS	
perspicuus	L	transparent	Rubus perspicuus	H	DS	
pertusus	L	perforated	Bothriochloa pertusa	H	DS	
perulatus	L	perulate	Enkianthus perulatus	H	DS	C
perutilis	L	very useful	Aniba perutilis*		DS	
petaloideus	G	petal-like	Gunnera petaloidea	H	DS	
petiolaris	L	petiolate	Banksia petiolaris	H	DS	C
petiolatus	L	petiolate	Banksia petiolaris	H	DS	
petraeus	L	rock, from petra, rock or cliff	Quercus petraea	H	DS	C
phaeus	G	dark brown or grey	Geranium phaeum	H	DS	C
phyllomaniacus	G	profusely leafy	Begonia phyllomaniaca*		D	
picturatus	L	embroidered	Festuca picturata	H	D	C
pictus	L	painted	Diplacus pictus	H	DS	C
pileatus	L	skull-capped; pileate	Eucalyptus pileata	H	DS	C
pilosus	L	hairy; pilose. (Also pilosulus.)	Xanthosia pilosa	H	DS	C
pilifer	L	hairy; pilose. (Also pilosulus.)	Xanthosia pilosa	H	DS	
pilularis	G	globular (the fruit), from pila, ball	Eucalyptus pilularis	H	D	C
pilulifer	G	globular (the fruit), from pila, ball	Eucalyptus pilularis	H	D	
pinguifolius	L	with waxy or thick leaves, from pinguis, fat	Acacia pinguifolia	H	DS	C
pinnatus	L	feathered; pinnate	Alloxylon pinnatum	H	DS	C
piperitus	L	peppery, from piper	Zanthoxylum piperitum	H	D	C
planus	L	flat	Eleocharis plana	H	DS	C
platyphyllus	G	broad-leaved. (Also platyphyllos.)	Eucalyptus platyphylla	H	DS	C
plebeius	L	plebeian	Veronica plebeia		D	
plenus	L	double; full	Corymbia plena	H	DS	
plenissimus	L	double; full	Corymbia plena	H	D	
pleurostachys	G	side-spiked	Orleanesia pleurostachys*		DS	
plicatus	L	pleated, from plico; plicate	Thuja plicata	H	DS	C
plumarius	L	plumed, from pluma; plumose	Dianthus plumarius	H	D	
plumatus	L	plumed, from pluma; plumose	Dianthus plumarius		D	
plumosus	L	plumed, from pluma; plumose	Dianthus plumarius	H	DS	
plumbeus	L	leaden	Merwilla plumbea	H	DS	
pluriflorus	L	many-flowered, from plurimus; pluriflor	Sannantha pluriflora	H	DS	
pluvialis	L	rainy-day	Caladenia pluvialis	H	S	
pocophorus	G	woolly	Rhododendron pocophorum*	H	D	
poculiformis	G	goblet-shaped	Eragrostis poculiformis*		DS	
podagricus	G	gout, from podagra. (Also podagraria.)	Jatropha podagrica		D	
poeticus	L	of poets	Narcissus poeticus	H	D	C
poetarum	L	of poets	Narcissus poeticus		D	
pogonanthus	G	bearded-flower	Abronia pogonantha		DS	
polaris	L	polar or far northern	Salix polaris	H	S	
polifolius	G	Greek: grey + Latin: leaf	Kalmia polifolia	H	D	
politus	L	polished	Gasteria polita	H	DS	
polycarpus	G	many-fruited	Corymbia polycarpa	H	DS	C
pomeridianus	L	afternoon	Chlorogalum pomeridianum	H	DS	
pomifer	L	fruit-bearing; pome-bearing	Maclura pomifera	H	D	C
pomponius	L	ostentatious, from pompa; tufted	Lilium pomponium	H	D	
ponderosus	L	weighty	Pinus ponderosa	H	DS	C
porophyllus	G	(apparently) porous-leaved	Saxifraga porophylla*	H	D	
porphyreus	G	purple; purple-red	Sedum porphyreum	H	DS	
porrigens	L	spreading, from porrigo	Galium porrigens	H		
potamophilus	G	river	Sebastiania potamophila	H	DS	
potatorum	L	of drinkers	Agave potatorum	H	D	C
praealtus	L	very high	Calochilus praealtus	H	D	
praecox	L	early-ripening, from coquo	Agapanthus praecox	H	DS	C
praemorsus	L	(apparently) nibbled, from morsus	Acacia praemorsa	H	DS	
praeruptorum	L	(inhabitant) of rough places, from praeruptus, rugged	Dicymbe praeruptorum*	H	S	
praestans	L	pre-eminent	Vaccinium praestans	H	D	C
praeteritus	L	departed; overlooked	Castilleja praeterita		DS	
praetermissus	L	overlooked, from praetermitto	Eucalyptus praetermissa		DS	C
praetextus	L	bordered; disguised	Cryptanthus praetextus	H	DS	
praevernus	L	before the spring, from vernus	Rhododendron praevernum*		D	
pratensis	L	meadow	Trifolium pratense	H	DS	C
pravissimus	L	most crooked, from pravus	Acacia pravissima	H	D	C
precatorius	L	prayer, from precator, suppliant	Euterpe precatoria		D	
preptus	G	distinguished	Rhododendron preptum*		D	
princeps	L	foremost	Roystonea princeps	H	D	
prismaticus	G	prism	Iris prismatica	H	DS	
proboscideus	G	long-snouted	Bulbophyllum proboscideum	H	DS	C
procerus	L	tall	Abies procera	H	DS	C
procumbens	L	near the ground, from procumbo; procumbent	Juniperus procumbens	H	DS	C
procurrens	L	extending, from procurro	Arabis procurrens	H	DS	C
prodigiosus	L	prodigious	Phyllolobium prodigiosum*	H		
productus	L	extended, from produco	Costus productus*	H	DS	
prolifer	L	proliferous, from proles, offshoot	Isolepis prolifera	H	DS	C
prolificus	L	prolific; proliferous	Hypericum prolificum	H	DS	C
pronus	L	tilted forward	Dracophyllum pronum		DS	
propinquus	L	kindred	Eucalyptus propinqua	H	DS	C
prostratus	L	on the ground; prostrate	Ceanothus prostratus	H	DS	C
protistus	G	very first	Rhododendron protistum	H		
protrusus	L	protruding, from protrudo	Melaleuca protrusa		DS	
pruinatus	L	(apparently) frosted, from pruina; pruinose	Begonia pruinata*	H	DS	
pruinosus	L	(apparently) frosted, from pruina; pruinose	Begonia pruinata*	H	DS	
pruriens	L	itchy, from prurio	Mucuna pruriens		DS	
psilostemon	G	smooth-stamened	Geranium psilostemon	H	DS	C
psittacinus	L	parrot, from psittacus	Impatiens psittacina, Heliconia psittacorum	H	DS	
psittacorum	L	parrot, from psittacus	Impatiens psittacina, Heliconia psittacorum	H	D	
pteroneurus	G	winged-vein	Cnidoscolus pteroneurus*	H	DS	
pubescens	L	fuzzy, from pubesco; pubescent	Betula pubescens	H	DS	C
pubiger	L	fuzzy, from pubesco; pubescent	Betula pubescens	H	D	
pubens	L	fuzzy, from pubesco; pubescent	Betula pubescens	H	DS	
pudicus	L	shy	Mimosa pudica	H	D	C
puderosus	L	shy	Mimosa pudica		D	
pugioniformis	L	dagger-shaped, from pugio	Dendrobium pugioniforme	H	DS	
pulcher	L	beautiful. Feminine pulchra, neuter pulchrum.	Senecio pulcher	H	DS	C
pulchellus	L	beautiful. Feminine pulchra, neuter pulchrum.	Senecio pulcher	H	DS	C
pullus	L	blackish	Piaranthus pullus*	H	DS	C
pulverulentus	L	powdery, from pulvis; pulverulent	Eucalyptus pulverulenta	H	DS	C
pulvinatus	L	cushiony, from pulvinus; pulvinate	Grimmia pulvinata	H	DS	C
pumilus	L	dwarf. (Also pumilio.)	Ficus pumila	H	DS	C
punctatus	L	dotted, originally from punctum, point or puncture; punctate	Monarda punctata	H	DS	C
pungens	L	pricking, from pungo; pungent	Picea pungens	H	DS	C
purgans	L	purgative, from purgo	Saurauia purgans*		D	
purpureus	L	purplish	Ceratodon purpureus	H	DS	C
purpuratus	L	royal; purplish	Eucalyptus purpurata	H	DS	C
purpurascens	L	light purple, from purpurasco. (Also purpurellus.)	Calamagrostis purpurascens	H	DS	C
pusillus	L	tiny	Potamogeton pusillus	H	DS	
pustulatus	L	(apparently) blistered, from pustula, pustule; pustulate	Eremophila pustulata	H	DS	
pycnanthus	G	densely flowering	Acacia pycnantha	H	S	
pyramidalis	L	pyramidal, from pyramis	Anacamptis pyramidalis	H	DS	C
pyramidatus	L	pyramidal, from pyramis	Anacamptis pyramidalis		D	
pyxidatus	G	lidded box	Eugenia pyxidata*		DS	
quadrifolius	L	four-leaved, from quattuor, four	Paris quadrifolia	H	DS	C
quinatus	L	five-part, from quinque, five	Akebia quinata	H	DS	C
racemosus	L	racemose, from racemus, cluster	Sambucus racemosa	H	DS	C
radiatus	L	radiating; radiate	Lycoris radiata	H	DS	C
radians	L	radiating; radiate	Lycoris radiata		DS	
radiosus	L	radiating; radiate	Lycoris radiata	H	DS	
radicans	L	rooting, originally from radix, root	Toxicodendron radicans	H	DS	C
radicatus	L	rooting, originally from radix, root	Toxicodendron radicans	H	DS	
radicosus	L	rooting, originally from radix, root	Toxicodendron radicans	H	DS	
radicum	L	rooting, originally from radix, root	Toxicodendron radicans		D	
radula	L	rasp, originally from rado, to scrape	Eurybia radula	H	DS	
ramentaceus	L	very scaly	Drosera ramentacea*	H	S	
ramosus	L	branching, from ramus, branch	Boronia ramosa	H	DS	C
ramulosus	L	branching, from ramus, branch	Boronia ramosa	H	DS	
ramosissimus	L	with many branches	Jamesbrittenia ramosissima	H	DS	C
rarus	L	rare	Hymenophyllum rarum		DS	
rariflorus	L	sparse-flowered	Rhynchospora rariflora	H	DS	
ravus	L	grey, dull yellow or tawny	Miconia rava*		DS	
reclinatus	L	reclined, from reclino	Phoenix reclinata	H	DS	
rectus	L	erect	Eucalyptus recta	H	DS	C
recurvus	L	curved back; recurved	Eucalyptus recurva	H	DS	
recurvatus	L	curved back; recurved	Eucalyptus recurva	H	DS	C
recutitus	L	(apparently) skinned, from cutis, skin	Pedicularis recutita*		DS	
redivivus	L	reviving	Styrax redivivus	H	DS	C
reductus	L	reduced, from reduco	Brocchinia reducta	H	DS	C
reflexus	L	bent backwards, from reflecto; reflexed	Dracaena reflexa	H	DS	C
refractus	L	bent backwards, from reflecto; reflexed	Dracaena reflexa	H	DS	
refulgens	L	reflecting, from refulgeo	Justicia refulgens*	H	D	
regalis	L	royal	Roystonea regia, Drosera regia	H	D	C
regius	L	royal	Roystonea regia, Drosera regia	H	D	C
religiosus	L	sacred	Ficus religiosa	H	D	
remotus	L	remote (in distribution)	Pinus remota	H	DS	C
reniformis	L	kidney-shaped, from renes, kidneys	Utricularia reniformis	H	DS	
repandus	L	curling at the edges	Boronia repanda	H	DS	C
repens	L	creeping	Trifolium repens	H	DS	C
reptans	L	creeping	Trifolium repens	H	DS	C
replicatus	L	folded, from replico	Lafoensia replicata	H	DS	
resinosus	L	resinous, from resina	Pinus resinosa	H	DS	C
resinifer	L	resinous, from resina	Pinus resinosa	H	DS	
resupinatus	L	bent backward, from resupino	Trifolium resupinatum		DS	
reticulatus	L	net-like, from reticulum; reticulate	Hippeastrum reticulatum	H	DS	C
retortus	L	twisted back, from retorqueo	Cerinthe retorta*	H	DS	
retroflexus	L	twisted back, from retorqueo	Cerinthe retorta*	H	DS	
retrofractus	L	twisted back, from retorqueo	Cerinthe retorta*	H	D	
retusus	L	blunt; retuse	Rhynchostylis retusa	H	DS	C
reversus	L	reversed	Alocasia reversa	H	DS	
revolutus	L	rolled inward, from revolvo; revolute	Orites revolutus	H	DS	C
rex	L	king. (Also reginae, queen.)	Cattleya rex	H	D	
rhabdotus	G	striped	Allium rhabdotum		D	
rhodanthus	G	with rose-red flowers	Eucalyptus rhodantha	H	DS	
rhombicus	G	rhombic	Acalypha rhomboidea		DS	
rhomboideus	G	rhombic	Acalypha rhomboidea	H	DS	
rhytidophyllus	G	wrinkled-leaf	Viburnum rhytidophyllum	H	DS	C
rigens	L	rigid. (Also rigescens.)	Muhlenbergia rigens	H	DS	C
rigidus	L	rigid. (Also rigescens.)	Muhlenbergia rigens	H	DS	C
ringens	L	gaping, from ringor	Melaleuca ringens	H	DS	C
riparius	L	riverside, from ripa, riverbank	Vitis riparia	H	DS	C
rivalis	L	brook	Calyptronoma rivalis	H	DS	C
rivularis	L	brook	Calyptronoma rivalis	H	DS	C
robustus	L	strong; solid	Metrosideros robusta	H	DS	C
rostratus	L	beaked; rostrate	Eremophila rostrata	H	DS	C
rotatus	L	circular, from rota, wheel; rotate	Hymenocallis rotata	H	DS	
rotundus	L	round	Cyperus rotundus	H	DS	
rotundatus	L	round	Cyperus rotundus	H	DS	
ruber	L	red. Feminine rubra, neuter rubrum.	Acer rubrum	H	DS	C
rubens	L	red. Feminine rubra, neuter rubrum.	Acer rubrum	H	DS	
rubescens	L	pale red, from rubesco	Calamagrostis rubescens	H	DS	
rubellus	L	pale red, from rubesco	Calamagrostis rubescens	H	DS	
rubiginosus	L	rusty-red, from rubigo, rust	Ficus rubiginosa	H	DS	C
rudis	L	untilled; rough	Eucalyptus rudis	H	DS	
rufus	L	reddish	Pterostylis rufa	H	DS	
rufescens	L	reddish	Pterostylis rufa		D	
rugosus	L	wrinkled; rugose	Rosa rugosa	H	DS	C
runcinatus	L	saw-toothed; runcinate	Crepis runcinata		DS	
rupestris	L	rock or cliff, from rupes; rupicolous	Brachychiton rupestris	H	DS	C
rupicola	L	rock or cliff, from rupes; rupicolous	Brachychiton rupestris	H	D	
rupifragus	L	rock-cleaving	Salix rupifraga	H	D	C
russatus	L	russet, from russus	Brachyotum russatum	H	D	
rusticanus	L	countryside	Armoracia rusticana	H	DS	C
rusticus	L	countryside	Armoracia rusticana	H	D	C
rutilans	L	reddish, from rutilo	Nidularium rutilans	H	DS	
saccatus	L	bag, from saccus; saccate	Persoonia saccata, Manicaria saccifera	H	DS	
saccifer	L	bag, from saccus; saccate	Persoonia saccata, Manicaria saccifera	H	D	
saccharatus	G	sugared (in flavour or appearance)	Caladenia saccharata	H	DS	
saccharifer	G	sugary. (Also saccharum.)	Acer saccharinum, Vitis saccharifera*		DS	C
saccharinus	G	sugary. (Also saccharum.)	Acer saccharinum, Vitis saccharifera*	H	DS	C
sagittalis	L	arrow, from sagitta; sagittate. (Also sagittatus.)	Crotalaria sagittalis	H	DS	
salinus	L	salt, from sal	Drosera salina	H	DS	
salsuginosus	L	salt marsh, from salsus	Castilleja salsuginosa		DS	
sanctus	L	holy	Anacamptis sancta	H	D	
sanguineus	L	bloody	Broughtonia sanguinea	H	DS	C
sapidus	L	tasty, from sapio, to have a flavour	Lissanthe sapida	H	DS	
saponaceus	L	soapy. (Also saponarius.)	Solanum saponaceum*		DS	
sarcodes	G	fleshy	Oncidium sarcodes	H	D	
sarmentosus	L	sarmentose, from sarmentum, twig	Piper sarmentosum	H	DS	C
sativus	L	cultivated, from sero	Cannabis sativa	H	DS	C
saturatus	L	colour-saturated	Taraxacum saturatum*		DS	
savannarum	L	savanna. Neo-Latin, from a 16th-century Taíno word.	Iris savannarum		DS	
saxatilis	L	rock-dwelling, from saxum; saxicolous. (Also saxorum, rock, and saxifraga, rock-breaker.)	Mimetes saxatilis, Acacia saxicola, Dudleya saxosa	H	DS	C
saxicola	L	rock-dwelling, from saxum; saxicolous. (Also saxorum, rock, and saxifraga, rock-breaker.)	Mimetes saxatilis, Acacia saxicola, Dudleya saxosa	H	DS	
saxosus	L	rock-dwelling, from saxum; saxicolous. (Also saxorum, rock, and saxifraga, rock-breaker.)	Mimetes saxatilis, Acacia saxicola, Dudleya saxosa	H	DS	
scaber	L	rough; scabrid. Feminine scabra, neuter scabrum. (Also scabiosus.)	Boronia scabra	H	DS	C
scalaris	L	ladder, from scalae	Vriesea scalaris	H	DS	C
scandens	L	climbing, from scando; scandent	Cobaea scandens	H	DS	C
scapiger	L	scaped; scapose	Caltha scaposa, Isotoma scapigera		DS	
scaposus	L	scaped; scapose	Caltha scaposa, Isotoma scapigera	H	DS	
scariosus	L	filmy; scarious	Cyperus scariosus	H	DS	C
scarlatinus	L	scarlet	Bromelia scarlatina		DS	
sceleratus	L	toxic	Ranunculus sceleratus		DS	
sceptrum	L	sceptre	Banksia sceptrum	H	D	
schidigerus	G	Greek: splinter + Latin: bearing	Yucca schidigera	H		
schistocalyx	G	with a split calyx	Rhododendron schistocalyx*		D	
schizopetalus	G	split-petalled	Hibiscus schizopetalus	H	DS	
scholaris	L	school, from schola, school or debate	Alstonia scholaris		DS	
scintillans	L	shining, from scintillo	Schizachyrium scintillans*, Triodia scintillans		D	
sclerocarpus	G	hard-fruited	Metrosideros sclerocarpa		D	
scoparius	L	broom, from scopae	Leptospermum scoparium, Cytisus scoparius	H	DS	C
scopulorum	L	cliff, from scopulus	Eucalyptus scopulorum	H	DS	C
scorpioides	L	scorpion, from scorpio; scorpioid	Myosotis scorpioides	H	DS	
scrobiculatus	L	dimpled, from scrobis, ditch; scrobiculate	Eremophila scrobiculata		DS	
sculptus	L	carved	Epidendrum sculptum		DS	
scutatus	L	shield, from scutum. (Also scutellaris, scutellatus.)	Rumex scutatus		DS	C
sebifer	L	fatty; oily. From sebum.	Triadica sebifera, Geranium sebosum*		DS	
sebosus	L	fatty; oily. From sebum.	Triadica sebifera, Geranium sebosum*		DS	
seclusus	L	secluded	Acacia seclusa		D	
secundus	L	second; secund. (Also secundatus.)	Epidendrum secundum	H	DS	C
securiger	L	axe-bearing	Tritonia securigera*		D	
segetum	L	grainfield, from seges	Glebionis segetum, Nigella segetalis*	H	DS	C
segetalis	L	grainfield, from seges	Glebionis segetum, Nigella segetalis*	H	DS	
semperflorens	L	ever-blooming, from semper, always	Bulbophyllum semperflorens	H	DS	
sempervirens	L	evergreen	Sequoia sempervirens	H	DS	C
senescens	L	greying, from senesco	Allium senescens	H	DS	C
senilis	L	aged; white-haired	Cephalocereus senilis	H	D	C
sensitivus	L	sensitive, from sentio; sensitive	Biophytum sensitivum, Onoclea sensibilis	H	DS	
sensibilis	L	sensitive, from sentio; sensitive	Biophytum sensitivum, Onoclea sensibilis	H	DS	
senticosus	L	thorny, from sentus	Eleutherococcus senticosus		DS	
sepiarius	L	hedge, from sepes	Calystegia sepium, Drypetes sepiaria		DS	
sepium	L	hedge, from sepes	Calystegia sepium, Drypetes sepiaria	H	DS	
septemfidus	L	cut into seven parts, from septem, seven.	Gentiana septemfida	H	DS	C
septentrionalis	L	northern	Asplenium septentrionale	H	DS	
sepulcralis	L	graveyard, from sepulcrum	Eucalyptus sepulcralis		DS	C
sepultus	L	buried	Euphorbia sepulta*		D	
sericifer	L	silky, from sericus; sericeous	Adenanthos sericeus, Araujia sericifera		D	C
sericeus	L	silky, from sericus; sericeous	Adenanthos sericeus, Araujia sericifera	H	DS	C
serotinus	L	late-blooming, from sero, late	Gagea serotina	H	DS	C
serpens	L	creeping	Eremophila serpens	H	DS	
serpentinus	L	serpentine	Rauvolfia serpentina, Melaleuca serpentina		DS	
serratus	L	toothed, from serra, saw; serrate. (Also serrula.)	Banksia serrata	H	DS	
serrulatus	L	fine-toothed; serrulate. (Also serrula.)	Prunus serrulata	H	DS	C
sesquipedalis	L	one-and-a-half-foot	Angraecum sesquipedale	H	DS	C
sessilis	L	sitting; stalkless	Banksia sessilis	H	DS	
setiger	L	bristly; setose	Papaver setigerum, Eremophila setacea, Polystichum setiferum, Corymbia setosa, Prunus setulosa	H	D	C
setaceus	L	bristly; setose	Papaver setigerum, Eremophila setacea, Polystichum setiferum, Corymbia setosa, Prunus setulosa	H	DS	C
setifer	L	bristly; setose	Papaver setigerum, Eremophila setacea, Polystichum setiferum, Corymbia setosa, Prunus setulosa	H	DS	C
setosus	L	bristly; setose	Papaver setigerum, Eremophila setacea, Polystichum setiferum, Corymbia setosa, Prunus setulosa	H	DS	C
setulosus	L	bristly; setose	Papaver setigerum, Eremophila setacea, Polystichum setiferum, Corymbia setosa, Prunus setulosa	H	DS	
sexangularis	L	hexagonal, from sex, six	Sedum sexangulare	H	DS	C
siculiformis	L	dagger-shaped, from sicula	Acacia siculiformis		D	
siderophloius	G	iron-barked	Eucalyptus siderophloia		D	
signatus	L	marked up, from signo	Acacia signata	H	D	
siliceus	L	sand, from silex, stone	Carex silicea	H	DS	
silvicola	L	woodland, from silva. See sylv-, below.	Weinmannia silvicola, Persoonia silvatica, Eucalyptus silvestris		DS	
silvaticus	L	woodland, from silva. See sylv-, below.	Weinmannia silvicola, Persoonia silvatica, Eucalyptus silvestris	H	DS	
silvestris	L	woodland, from silva. See sylv-, below.	Weinmannia silvicola, Persoonia silvatica, Eucalyptus silvestris	H	DS	
similis	L	similar; generic	Melaleuca similis	H	DS	C
simplex	L	simple; unbranched. (Also simplicissimus, simplest.)	Ruellia simplex	H	DS	C
simulans	L	imitative	Eremophila simulans	H	DS	
sinuatus	L	sinuous; sinuate	Pterostylis sinuata	H	DS	C
smaragdinus	L	emerald-green, from smaragdus, a green gem	Epidendrum smaragdinum		DS	
sobolifer	L	shoot-bearing; basal-shoot-bearing	Stylidium soboliferum	H	DS	
socialis	L	confederated; colony-forming	Ledebouria socialis	H	D	
solaris	L	solar	Drosera solaris		D	
solidus	L	dense	Corydalis solida	H	DS	C
solstitialis	L	summer-solstice	Centaurea solstitialis		DS	
somnifer	L	sedating	Withania somnifera	H	D	C
sordidus	L	dirty (in appearance)	Salvia sordida	H	DS	
sororius	L	sisterly	Viola sororia		D	C
spadiceus	L	dark brown	Prasophyllum spadiceum		DS	
sparsus	L	sparse, from spargo, to scatter	Beaufortia sparsa		DS	
spathulatus	L	spatulate. (Also spathaceus, spathed, from spatha, blade.)	Sarcochilus spathulatus	H	DS	
speciosus	L	showy	Banksia speciosa	H	DS	C
spectabilis	L	remarkable	Tahina spectabilis	H	D	C
speculatus	L	mirrored, from speculum	Rubus speculatus*		D	
sphacelatus	G	withered	Setaria sphacelata		DS	
sphaericus	G	spherical. (Also sphaeroideus.)	Corymbia sphaerica	H	D	
sphaeroides	G	spherical. (Also sphaeroideus.)	Corymbia sphaerica		D	
sphegodes	G	wasp	Ophrys sphegodes		D	
sphenantherus	G	wedge-anthered	Schisandra sphenanthera		D	
spicifer	L	spike, from spica; spicate. (Also spicatus.)	Swintonia spicifera, Melaleuca spicigera, Micraira spiciforma*		DS	
spiciger	L	spike, from spica; spicate. (Also spicatus.)	Swintonia spicifera, Melaleuca spicigera, Micraira spiciforma*	H	D	C
spiciformis	L	spike, from spica; spicate. (Also spicatus.)	Swintonia spicifera, Melaleuca spicigera, Micraira spiciforma*	H	DS	
spinescens	L	spiny, from spina; spinose. (Also spinulosus.)	Acacia spinescens, Cenchrus spinifex, Prunus spinosa	H	DS	
spinifer	L	spiny, from spina; spinose. (Also spinulosus.)	Acacia spinescens, Cenchrus spinifex, Prunus spinosa		DS	
spinifex	L	spiny, from spina; spinose. (Also spinulosus.)	Acacia spinescens, Cenchrus spinifex, Prunus spinosa	H	D	
spinosus	L	spiny, from spina; spinose. (Also spinulosus.)	Acacia spinescens, Cenchrus spinifex, Prunus spinosa	H	DS	C
spinulifer	L	spiny, from spina; spinose. (Also spinulosus.)	Acacia spinescens, Cenchrus spinifex, Prunus spinosa		D	
spinosissimus	L	spiniest	Mammillaria spinosissima	H	D	C
spiralis	L	coiled or twisted, from spira; spiral	Thelymitra spiralis	H	DS	
spissus	L	crowded	Pterostylis spissa		DS	
splendidus	L	splendid	Eremophila splendens, Boronia splendida	H	DS	C
splendens	L	splendid	Eremophila splendens, Boronia splendida	H	D	C
spurius	L	spurious	Eremophila spuria	H	DS	C
squalidus	L	squalid	Senecio squalidus	H	DS	C
squalens	L	squalid	Senecio squalidus		D	
squamosus	L	scaly	Pterostylis squamata, Eucalyptus squamosa	H	DS	C
squamatus	L	scaly	Pterostylis squamata, Eucalyptus squamosa	H	DS	C
squarrosus	L	with extended tips; squarrose. Cognate to squamosus.	Bromus squarrosus	H	DS	C
stamineus	L	well-stamened, from stamen, thread	Trillium stamineum	H	DS	
stans	L	standing, from sto	Tecoma stans	H	DS	C
stauracanthus	G	cross-spined	Cryosophila stauracantha*		D	
stellaris	L	star, from stella; stellate. (Also stellulatus.)	Hibbertia stellaris, Allium stellatum	H	DS	
stellatus	L	star, from stella; stellate. (Also stellulatus.)	Hibbertia stellaris, Allium stellatum	H	DS	C
stelliger	L	star, from stella; stellate. (Also stellulatus.)	Hibbertia stellaris, Allium stellatum		D	
stenocarpus	G	narrow-fruited	Hakea stenocarpa	H	D	
sterilis	L	infertile; sterile	Bromus sterilis	H	DS	
stipulaceus	L	stipuled, from stipula, stalk	Dalbergia stipulacea, Palaquium stipulare, Rubus stipulatus	H	DS	
stipularis	L	stipuled, from stipula, stalk	Dalbergia stipulacea, Palaquium stipulare, Rubus stipulatus	H	DS	
stipulatus	L	stipuled, from stipula, stalk	Dalbergia stipulacea, Palaquium stipulare, Rubus stipulatus	H	D	
stolonifer	L	stolon-bearing; stoloniferous	Drosera stolonifera	H	D	C
stramineus	L	straw; straw-coloured	Parsonsia straminea		DS	
strangulatus	L	constricted, from strangulo	Trigonella strangulata*		DS	
strepens	L	rattling, from strepo	Ruellia strepens		D	
streptophyllus	G	twisted-leaf	Tillandsia streptophylla	H	D	
striatus	L	striped; striate. (Also striatulus.)	Bletilla striata, Dendrobium striolatum	H	DS	C
striolatus	L	striped; striate. (Also striatulus.)	Bletilla striata, Dendrobium striolatum	H	DS	
strictus	L	drawn tight; upright	Orthoceras strictum	H	DS	C
strigosus	L	meagre; strigose	Caladenia strigosa	H	DS	
strigillosus	L	meagre; strigose	Caladenia strigosa		D	
strobilifer	L	cone-bearing	Deuterocohnia strobilifera	H	D	
strongylophyllus	G	rounded-leaf	Acacia strongylophylla		D	
strumosus	L	swollen	Hakea strumosa	H	DS	C
strumarius	L	swollen	Hakea strumosa		D	
stylosus	L	well-styled	Rhizophora stylosa	H	DS	C
styracifluus	L	gummy	Liquidambar styraciflua	H	D	C
suaveolens	L	sweet-scented	Brugmansia suaveolens	H	DS	C
suavis	L	sweet	Cymbidium suave	H	DS	
subacaulis	L	partly stemmed	Calystegia subacaulis	H	D	
subalpinus	L	subalpine, from alpinus; lower-mountain	Jacaranda subalpina	H	DS	
subauriculatus	L	partly eared, from auricula, ear	Pseuderanthemum subauriculatum		DS	
subcaeruleus	L	light blue, from caeruleus, sky blue	Acacia subcaerulea		DS	
subcanus	L	partly grey, from canus	Pavetta subcana*		DS	
subcarnosus	L	partly fleshy	Aizoon subcarnosum*		D	
subcordatus	L	almost heart-shaped	Alisma subcordatum	H	DS	C
subdentatus	L	partly toothed, from dentatus	Epilobium subdentatum*		DS	
subdivaricatus	L	partly spreading, from divarico	Erica subdivaricata*		D	
subelongatus	L	partly elongated, from longus	Jasminum elongatum		DS	
suberectus	L	angled, from erectus	Atriplex suberecta		DS	
suberosus	L	partly erose	Boronia suberosa	H	DS	
subfalcatus	L	almost sickle-shaped, from falcatus	Lysiana subfalcata		DS	
subglaucus	L	partly glaucous, from glaucus	Juncus subglaucus*		DS	
subhirtellus	L	slightly hairy, from hirtus	Drosera subhirtella	H	DS	C
submersus	L	submerged, from submergo	Ceratophyllum submersum	H	DS	
subpetiolatus	L	partly petiolate	Navia subpetiolata		D	
subscandens	L	likely to climb, from scando	Siparuna subscandens*		DS	
subterraneus	L	underground	Trifolium subterraneum	H	DS	
subulatus	L	awl-shaped; subulate	Phlox subulata	H	DS	C
subvillosus	L	partly shaggy, from villosus	Allium subvillosum	H	DS	
succisus	L	severed below	Robiquetia succisa		DS	
succulentus	L	fleshy; succulent	Lupinus succulentus	H	DS	C
suffrutescens	L	partly shrubby, from frutex, shrub	Portulaca suffrutescens, Dillenia suffruticosa	H	DS	C
suffruticosus	L	partly shrubby, from frutex, shrub	Portulaca suffrutescens, Dillenia suffruticosa	H	DS	C
sulcatus	L	furrowed, from sulcus; sulcate	Persoonia sulcata	H	DS	C
sulphureus	L	sulphur-yellow. Stearn also lists sulfureus; (Also sulphureas.)	Pimelea sulphurea, Siphocampylus sulfureus	H	DS	C
superbus	L	proud; superb. (Also superbiens.)	Calothamnus superbus	H	D	C
superciliaris	L	eyebrow, from supercilium	Begonia superciliaris*		D	
supinus	L	supine	Asperula supina*	H	DS	
supranubius	L	above the clouds, from nubes, cloud	Genista supranubia*		D	
surculosus	L	shoot-bearing, from surculus, a shoot	Mammillaria surculosa	H	DS	
suspensus	L	suspended	Forsythia suspensa	H	DS	C
sylvaticus	L	woodland, from sylva. See silv-, above.	Nyssa sylvatica, Angelica sylvestris, Caladenia sylvicola, Aruncus sylvester	H	DS	C
sylvester	L	woodland, from sylva. See silv-, above.	Nyssa sylvatica, Angelica sylvestris, Caladenia sylvicola, Aruncus sylvester	H	D	
sylvestris	L	woodland, from sylva. See silv-, above.	Nyssa sylvatica, Angelica sylvestris, Caladenia sylvicola, Aruncus sylvester	H	DS	C
sylvicola	L	woodland, from sylva. See silv-, above.	Nyssa sylvatica, Angelica sylvestris, Caladenia sylvicola, Aruncus sylvester	H	DS	
tabuliformis	L	flat, from tabula, board	Aeonium tabuliforme	H	DS	C
taediger	L	torch-bearing, from taeda, torch. (Also taeda.)	Raphia taedigera		D	
tanastylus	G	long-styled	Rhododendron tanastylum*		D	
tapetiformis	L	woven (like tapestry or carpet), from tapes	Rhododendron tapetiforme*		D	
tardus	L	tardy; late.	Tulipa tarda, Allium tardiflorum	H	DS	
tardivus	L	tardy; late.	Tulipa tarda, Allium tardiflorum		D	
tectorum	L	of roofs, from tectum	Sempervivum tectorum	H	DS	C
tectus	L	covered	Genoplesium tectum		DS	
telmateius	G	of soggy ground	Equisetum telmateia		DS	
temenius	G	of sacred places	Rhododendron temenium*		D	
temulentus	L	drunk	Lolium temulentum	H	DS	
temulus	L	drunk	Lolium temulentum		D	
tenax	L	tenacious	Sideroxylon tenax	H	DS	C
tenebrosus	L	gloomy	Cattleya tenebrosa*	H	DS	
tenellulus	L	tender; delicate	Felicia tenella		D	
tenellus	L	tender; delicate	Felicia tenella	H	DS	C
tener	L	delicate	Sticherus tener	H		
tentaculatus	L	tentacled	Caladenia tentaculata	H		
tenuis	L	thin. (Also tenuissimus, thinnest.)	Cystopteris tenuis	H	DS	C
teres	L	rounded or circular; terete	Dampiera teres	H	DS	
terminalis	L	at the end, from terminus; terminal	Persoonia terminalis	H	DS	C
ternatus	L	triple, from ternus; ternate	Sedum ternatum	H	DS	C
terrestris	L	ground-dwelling; terrestrial	Lysimachia terrestris	H	DS	
tessellatus	L	tessellated, from tessella, a small cube	Thamnocalamus tessellatus	H	DS	C
testaceus	L	brick-coloured, from testa, brick	Caladenia testacea	H	DS	C
testicularis	L	testicular, from testiculus	Aglaia testicularis*	H	D	
testiculatus	L	testicular, from testiculus	Aglaia testicularis*		DS	
testudo	L	tortoise	Durio testudinarius		D	
testudinarius	L	tortoise	Durio testudinarius	H	D	
tetracanthus	G	four-spined	Barleria tetracantha		D	
tetragonus	G	four-angled; tetragonal	Dendrobium tetragonum	H	DS	C
tetrandrus	G	four-anthered	Myoporum tetrandrum	H	DS	
tetranthus	G	four-flowered	Lactuca tetrantha		D	
tetraphyllus	G	with four leaves	Polycarpon tetraphyllum	H	D	
tetrapterus	G	four-winged	Eucalyptus tetraptera	H	DS	C
textilis	L	woven	Juncus textilis	H	DS	
thermalis	L	warm springs, from thermae	Azima tetracantha		DS	
thurifer	L	incense-bearing	Anisoptera thurifera		D	
thyrsiflorus	L	thyrse-flowered, from thyrsus, stalk or vined staff. (Also thyrsoideus and thyrsoides.)	Ceanothus thyrsiflorus	H	DS	C
tigrinus	L	striped; spotted. From tigris, tiger.	Cymbidium tigrinum	H	DS	
tinctorum	L	of dyers, from tinctus, dyed	Indigofera tinctoria		DS	
tinctorius	L	of dyers, from tinctus, dyed	Indigofera tinctoria	H	DS	C
tinctus	L	dyed	Fuchsia tincta*		DS	
tingens	L	tingeing, from tingo	Marsdenia tingens*		DS	
titanius	G	titanic. (Also titanus.)	Amorphophallus titanum		D	
tomentosus	L	matted, from tomentum, cushion-filling; tomentose	Alectryon tomentosus	H	DS	C
tonsus	L	shaved	Dischidia tonsa*		DS	
torminalis	L	(for) colic, from tormina	Sorbus torminalis		D	C
torosus	L	muscular; cylindrical with constrictions	Mandevilla torosa		DS	
torridus	L	parched	Coccothrinax torrida		DS	
tortilis	L	twisted. (Also tortuosus.)	Prasophyllum tortilis, Corymbia torta	H	DS	
tortus	L	twisted. (Also tortuosus.)	Prasophyllum tortilis, Corymbia torta	H	DS	
toxicarius	L	toxic, from toxicum, poison	Antiaris toxicaria	H	DS	
toxicus	L	toxic, from toxicum, poison	Antiaris toxicaria		D	
toxifer	L	toxic, from toxicum, poison	Antiaris toxicaria		D	
trachyspermus	G	rough-seeded	Kewa trachysperma*	H	S	
transitorius	L	short-lived, originally from transeo, to pass through briefly	Caladenia transitoria	H	S	
translucens	L	translucent, from transluceo	Acacia translucens		DS	
transparens	L	transparent, from trans + pareo	Pteris transparens*		D	
trapeziformis	L	irregularly four-sided; trapeziform	Chiloglottis trapeziformis	H	DS	
tremulus	L	shaking. (Also tremuloides.)	Pteris tremula	H	DS	C
triacanthus	L	three-spined. (Also triacanthos.)	Opuntia triacantha		D	
triandrus	G	three-anthered	Salix triandra	H	DS	
triangularis	L	triangular, from triangulus	Prasophyllum triangulare	H	DS	C
triangulatus	L	triangular, from triangulus	Prasophyllum triangulare	H	D	
tricaudatus	L	three-tailed	Aristolochia tricaudata		D	
tricephalus	L	three-headed	Coussarea tricephala*		D	
trichophorus	G	hairy	Triglochin trichophora		D	
trichotomus	G	three-branched	Clerodendrum trichotomum	H	D	C
tricoccus	G	three-lobed	Allium tricoccum		DS	
tricolor	L	three-coloured, from color	Viola tricolor	H	DS	C
tricornis	L	three-horned	Delphinium tricorne		DS	
tricuspidatus	L	three-pointed, from tricuspis	Parthenocissus tricuspidata	H	DS	C
tridens	L	three-toothed	Larrea tridentata		D	
tridentalus	L	three-toothed	Larrea tridentata		DS	C
trifidus	L	split into three; trifid	Galium trifidum	H	DS	C
triflorus	L	three-flowered	Geum triflorum	H	D	C
trifolius	L	with three leaflets; trifoliate	Coptis trifolia	H	D	C
trifoliatus	L	with three leaflets; trifoliate	Coptis trifolia	H	D	C
trifurcatus	L	three-forked, from furca	Hakea trifurcata	H	DS	
trifurcus	L	three-forked, from furca	Hakea trifurcata		DS	
trigonophyllus	G	with triangular leaves	Acacia trigonophylla	H	D	
trilobatus	L	three-lobed	Malus trilobata	H	DS	C
trimestris	L	three-month, from mensis, month	Lavatera trimestris	H	DS	
trinervis	L	with three nerves (veins), originally from nervus	Conothamnus trinervis	H	DS	
trinotatus	L	triple-marked	Palmorchis trinotata*		D	
tripetalus	G	three-petaled	Magnolia tripetala	H	DS	C
triphyllus	G	three-leaved	Gladiolus triphyllus	H	D	C
tripterus	G	three-winged. (Also tripteris.)	Acacia triptera	H	D	C
trispermus	G	three-seeded	Reutealis trisperma		DS	
tristachyus	G	three-spiked	Diphasiastrum tristachyum		D	
tristis	L	sad; dull	Pterostylis tristis	H	DS	C
triternatus	L	with three groups of leaflets in threes, from ternus, triple	Lomatium triternatum	H	DS	C
trivialis	L	common	Alisma triviale	H	DS	C
tropicus	G	tropical	Acacia tropica		DS	
truncatus	L	truncated, from truncus, dismembered or deprived of branches; truncate	Lupinus truncatus, Telopea truncata	H	DS	C
tubatus	L	trumpet, from tuba	Oxypetalum tubatum*		DS	
tubaeformis	L	trumpet, from tuba	Oxypetalum tubatum*		DS	
tuberculatus	L	bumpy; tuberculate	Diospyros tuberculata, Eleocharis tuberculosa	H	DS	
tuberculosus	L	bumpy; tuberculate	Diospyros tuberculata, Eleocharis tuberculosa	H	D	
tuberosus	L	swollen, from tuber, a swelling; tuberous	Thysanotus tuberosus	H	DS	C
tubulosus	L	tubular	Leichhardtia tubulosa	H	DS	C
tubifer	L	tubular	Leichhardtia tubulosa	H	D	
tuguriorum	L	of hut-dwellers, from tugurium, hut	Calystegia tuguriorum		D	
tumidus	L	tumid	Verticordia tumida		DS	
turbinatus	L	shaped like a top, from turbineus; turbinate	Stylidium turbinatum	H	DS	
turgidus	L	swollen; turgid	Panicum turgidum		DS	
typicus	G	typical	Arthraxon typicus*		DS	
tytthocarpus	G	small-fruited	Cotoneaster tytthocarpus*		DS	
uliginosus	L	of marshes; from uligo, dampness	Salvia uliginosa	H	DS	C
umbellatus	L	umbelled, from umbella, umbrella	Ornithogalum umbellatum	H	DS	C
umbonatus	L	with a central knob, from umbo, knob; umbonate	Corymbia umbonata		DS	
umbraculifer	L	sunshade-bearing, from umbraculum, sunshade	Corypha umbraculifera		DS	
umbrella	L	umbrella, from umbra, shade	Soroseris umbrella*		DS	
umbrosus	L	shady; shade-tolerant	Scrophularia umbrosa	H	DS	C
uncinatus	L	hooked; uncinate	Hemiphora uncinata, Chamelaucium uncinatum	H	DS	C
undulatus	L	wavy, from unda; undulate	Nerine undulata	H	DS	C
undatus	L	wavy, from unda; undulate	Nerine undulata	H	DS	
unguiculatus	L	clawed, from unguis	Bulbophyllum unguiculatum	H	DS	C
unguicularis	L	clawed, from unguis	Bulbophyllum unguiculatum	H	DS	
uniflorus	L	one-flowered	Monotropa uniflora, Ipheion uniflorum	H	D	C
urbanus	L	town. (Also urbius.)	Geum urbanum	H	DS	C
urbicus	L	town. (Also urbius.)	Geum urbanum	H	D	
urceolatus	L	flask, from urceolus; urceolate	Gastrodia urceolata	H	DS	C
urens	L	burning, from uro	Caryota urens	H	DS	
urniger	L	urn, from urna	Pogonatum urnigerum		DS	
ursinus	L	bear, from ursus	Allium ursinum	H	D	C
usitatissimus	L	most useful, from usitatus	Linum usitatissimum		DS	C
ustulatus	L	(apparently) scorched, from uro	Neotinea ustulata		D	
utilis	L	useful	Brosimum utile	H	DS	C
utriculatus	L	bladder-like; with utricles	Tillandsia utriculata	H	DS	
utriculosus	L	bladder-like; with utricles	Tillandsia utriculata		DS	
vacillans	L	variable, from vacillo	Vaccinium vacillans		DS	
vagans	L	widely distributed; wandering. From vagor, to wander.	Erica vagans	H	DS	C
vaginatus	L	sheathed	Cyperus vaginatus	H	DS	
vaginalis	L	sheathed	Cyperus vaginatus	H	DS	
vaginifer	L	sheathed	Cyperus vaginatus		D	
validus	L	strong; well-developed	Yucca valida		DS	
vallicola	L	valley-dweller	Carex vallicola		D	
variabilis	L	variable, from vario	Pseuderanthemum variabile	H	DS	C
varians	L	variable, from vario	Pseuderanthemum variabile	H	DS	
variatus	L	variable, from vario	Pseuderanthemum variabile	H	D	
varicosus	L	with enlarged veins or vessels	Oncidium varicosum	H	S	
variegatus	L	variegated	Codiaeum variegatum	H	DS	C
varius	L	diverse	Hakea varia	H	DS	
vegetus	L	vigorous	Astragalus vegetus*	H	DS	
vellereus	L	fleecy, from vellus, fleece	Ballota vellerea*		DS	
velox	L	quick; quick-growing	Rubus velox		D	
velutinus	L	velvety, from French and Latin	Myoporum velutinum	H	DS	C
venator	L	hunter	Rhododendron venator*		D	
venenatus	L	poisonous, from venenum	Alstonia venenata		DS	
venenosus	L	very poisonous	Toxicoscordion venenosum	H	DS	
venosus	L	heavily veined, from vena	Haworthiopsis venosa	H	DS	
ventricosus	L	ventricose (swollen, often on one side), from venter, belly	Ensete ventricosum	H	DS	
venustus	L	pretty	Calochortus venustus	H	DS	C
verecundus	L	shy	Boronia verecunda	H	D	
vermiculatus	L	wormlike; having waving lines	Caroxylon vermiculatum		D	
vermicularis	L	wormlike; having waving lines	Caroxylon vermiculatum		DS	
vernicosus	L	varnished	Eucalyptus vernicosa	H	DS	C
vernix	L	varnish. (Also vernicifluus.)	Acacia verniciflua		D	
vernus	L	of spring	Ficaria verna, Leucojum vernum	H	DS	C
vernalis	L	of spring	Ficaria verna, Leucojum vernum	H	DS	
verrucosus	L	warty, from verruca; verrucose	Sesuvium verrucosum, Berberis verruculosa	H	DS	
verruculosus	L	warty, from verruca; verrucose	Sesuvium verrucosum, Berberis verruculosa	H	DS	C
versicolor	L	variably coloured	Iris versicolor	H	DS	C
verticillatus	L	whorled, from vertex, a whorl; verticillate	Banksia verticillata	H	DS	C
verticillaris	L	whorled, from vertex, a whorl; verticillate	Banksia verticillata		D	
verus	L	true	Aloe vera	H	DS	C
vescus	L	small; feeble; edible	Fragaria vesca	H	D	
vesicarius	L	bladder, from vesica	Carex vesicaria	H	DS	C
vesiculosus	L	vesicle, from vesicula, seed vesicle	Aldrovanda vesiculosa	H	DS	
vespertilionis	L	(wings) of a bat	Christia vespertilionis*		D	
vespertinus	L	(flowering) in the evening	Asplenium vespertinum	H	DS	
vestitus	L	covered	Leucospermum vestitum	H	DS	
vexans	L	troublesome, from vexo	Buddleja vexans	H	D	
vexillaris	L	with a flag, from vexillum	Pachycarpus vexillaris*		DS	
viarum	L	by the side of the road or path, from via. (Also vialis.)	Solanum viarum		DS	
victorialis	L	victorious, from victoria	Allium victorialis		D	
vigilis	L	vigilant, from vigilo	Diascia vigilis	H		
villosus	L	hairy; villous	Vicia villosa	H	DS	C
vinealis	L	vineyard, from vinea	Allium vineale		D	
vinifer	L	yielding wine, from vinum	Vitis vinifera	H	D	
vinosus	L	wine-red	Schefflera vinosa		DS	
violaceus	L	violet-coloured, from viola, a violet	Banksia violacea	H	DS	C
violascens	L	light violet. (Also violescens.)	Pitcairnia violascens		D	
virens	L	green	Rhus virens	H	DS	
viridis	L	fresh-green	Veratrum viride	H	DS	C
viridescens	L	light green	Ferocactus viridescens, Nassella viridula	H	DS	
viridulus	L	light green	Ferocactus viridescens, Nassella viridula	H	DS	
viridissimus	L	greenest	Forsythia viridissima	H	D	C
virgatus	L	twiggy	Homoranthus virgatus, Panicum virgatum	H	DS	C
virginalis	L	virginal; white. (Also virgineus.)	Disa virginalis	H	D	
virgultorum	L	hedge, from virgulta	Solanum virgultorum*		D	
viscidus	L	sticky; viscid	Phacelia viscida	H	DS	
viscosus	L	sticky	Dittrichia viscosa	H	DS	C
vitaceus	L	vine, from vitis. (Also viticella.)	Piper vitaceum*	H	DS	
vitellinus	L	yolk-coloured, from vitellus	Xanthophyllum vitellinum	H	DS	
vittatus	L	striped, from vitta, a (worn) band	Hakea vittata	H	DS	
vittiger	L	striped, from vitta, a (worn) band	Hakea vittata		D	
vivax	L	long-lived	Phyllostachys vivax	H		
viviparus	L	viviparous	Bistorta vivipara	H	S	
volubilis	L	circling around	Comesperma volubile	H	DS	
volutus	L	with rolled leaves, from voluto	Epidendrum volutum*		DS	
vomitorius	L	causing vomiting, from vomo	Ilex vomitoria	H	D	C
vulcanicus	L	of volcanos	Peperomia vulcanica		DS	
vulgaris	L	common	Marrubium vulgare	H	DS	C
vulpinus	L	of foxes, from vulpes	Vitis vulpina		D	
xanthinus	G	yellow	Acacia xanthina	H	D	C
xylonacanthus	G	woody-spined	Agave xylonacantha		D	
zaleucus	G	very white	Rhododendron zaleucum*		D	
zebrinus	L	zebra-striped, from Portuguese and Neo-Latin	Tradescantia zebrina	H	DS	
zibethinus	L	(stinking) like a civet	Durio zibethinus	H	D	
zonatus	L	banded, from zona, belt; zonate	Cryptanthus zonatus	H	DS	
zonalis	L	banded, from zona, belt; zonate	Cryptanthus zonatus	H	D	

== See also ==
- Glossary of botanical terms
- List of Greek and Latin roots in English
- List of Latin and Greek words commonly used in systematic names
- List of plant genus names with etymologies: A–C, D–K, L–P, Q–Z
- List of plant genera named after people: A–C, D–J, K–P, Q–Z
- List of plant family names with etymologies
