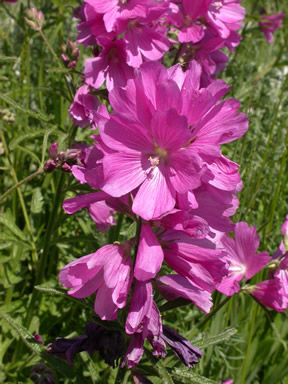

Conservation status
- Imperiled (NatureServe)

Scientific classification
- Kingdom: Plantae
- Clade: Tracheophytes
- Clade: Angiosperms
- Clade: Eudicots
- Clade: Rosids
- Order: Malvales
- Family: Malvaceae
- Genus: Sidalcea
- Species: S. nelsoniana

Binomial name
- Sidalcea nelsoniana Piper

= Sidalcea nelsoniana =

Species of flowering plant

Sidalcea nelsoniana is a rare species of flowering plant in the mallow family known by the common names Nelson's checkerbloom and Nelson's checkermallow. It is native to the Willamette Valley and Coast Range of Oregon and the southwestern corner of Washington in the United States. It is threatened by the destruction and degradation of its habitat, and it was a federally listed threatened species of the United States.

== Description ==
This plant is a perennial herb producing several erect stems up to a meter tall from a thick taproot. The blades of the leaves are variable in shape. In general, the basal leaves are palmate in shape and the upper leaves are more deeply divided. Each stem can bear up to 100 pink flowers in a spikelike raceme. The species is gynodioecious, producing bisexual flowers and female flowers that lack the ability to produce pollen. Each flower has a purple-tinged calyx of sepals and five petals up to 1.5 centimeters in length. The fruit is a schizocarp with one seed in each of its seven to nine segments. Blooming occurs in late May through mid-July. The plants reproduce sexually via seed and vegetatively by sprouting from broken-off pieces of the root.

== Distribution and habitat ==
This plant can be found in a number of wetland habitat types and is not limited to a specific kind. It grows in wet open habitat such as sedge and grass meadows and the transition zone from prairie to woodland. It can grow on sunny forest edges and in riparian habitat and it is tolerant of disturbance, occurring even near campgrounds.

There are six main population centers, four in the Willamette Valley and one each in the Coast Range and southwestern Washington State. The latter is made up of two populations. A large population is present in William L. Finley National Wildlife Refuge. The largest population in the Oregon Coast Range is located at Walker Flat in Yamhill County. Most populations are small. About 48% of them contain fewer than 100 plants and 31% contain under 25.

== Conservation ==
This plant faces a number of threats and has been listed as an endangered species since 1993, but was proposed for delisting by United States Fish and Wildlife Service in April 2022 due to some progress in restoration of the prairie habitats this species requires. Fire suppression is one of the primary threats to this species, because its habitat becomes overgrown with thick vegetation in the absence of the normal fire regime that maintains open clearings. Wildfires are beneficial for this plant, because they clear the large and woody vegetation that prevent sunlight from reaching it.

Despite the plant's tolerance of disturbance, populations occurring near roads and cultivated fields are vulnerable. Many populations in the Willamette Valley are threatened or already extirpated by agricultural and urban development. Over the last 150 years 99% of the wetland habitat in the Willamette Valley has been altered or destroyed. The possible future construction of a dam threatens a large population. Even in protected areas the plant is threatened by the invasion of non-native plant species. Such weeds include reed canary grass (Phalaris arundinacea). Other threats include herbicides and predation by the weevil Macrohoptus sidalceae. This checkerbloom is known to hybridize with its Sidalcea relatives, such as Sidalcea cusickii, a process that can lead to genetic pollution of the rare plant.
