= Prairie mallow =

Prairie mallow is a common name for several North American plants and may refer to:

- Sidalcea candida, with white flowers, native from Nevada to Wyoming and south to New Mexico
- Sidalcea malviflora, with pink flowers, native from Washington to California
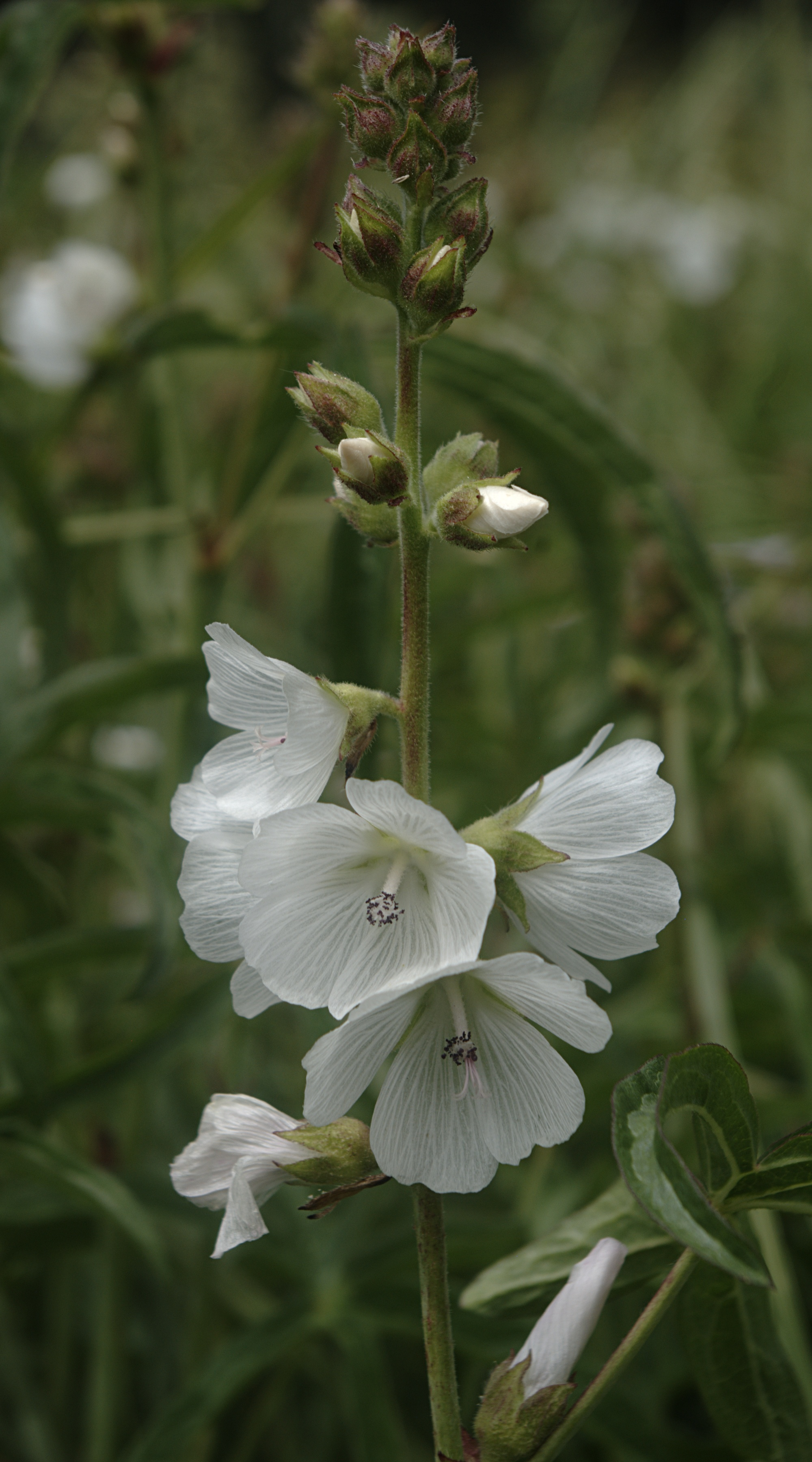
Sidalcea candida

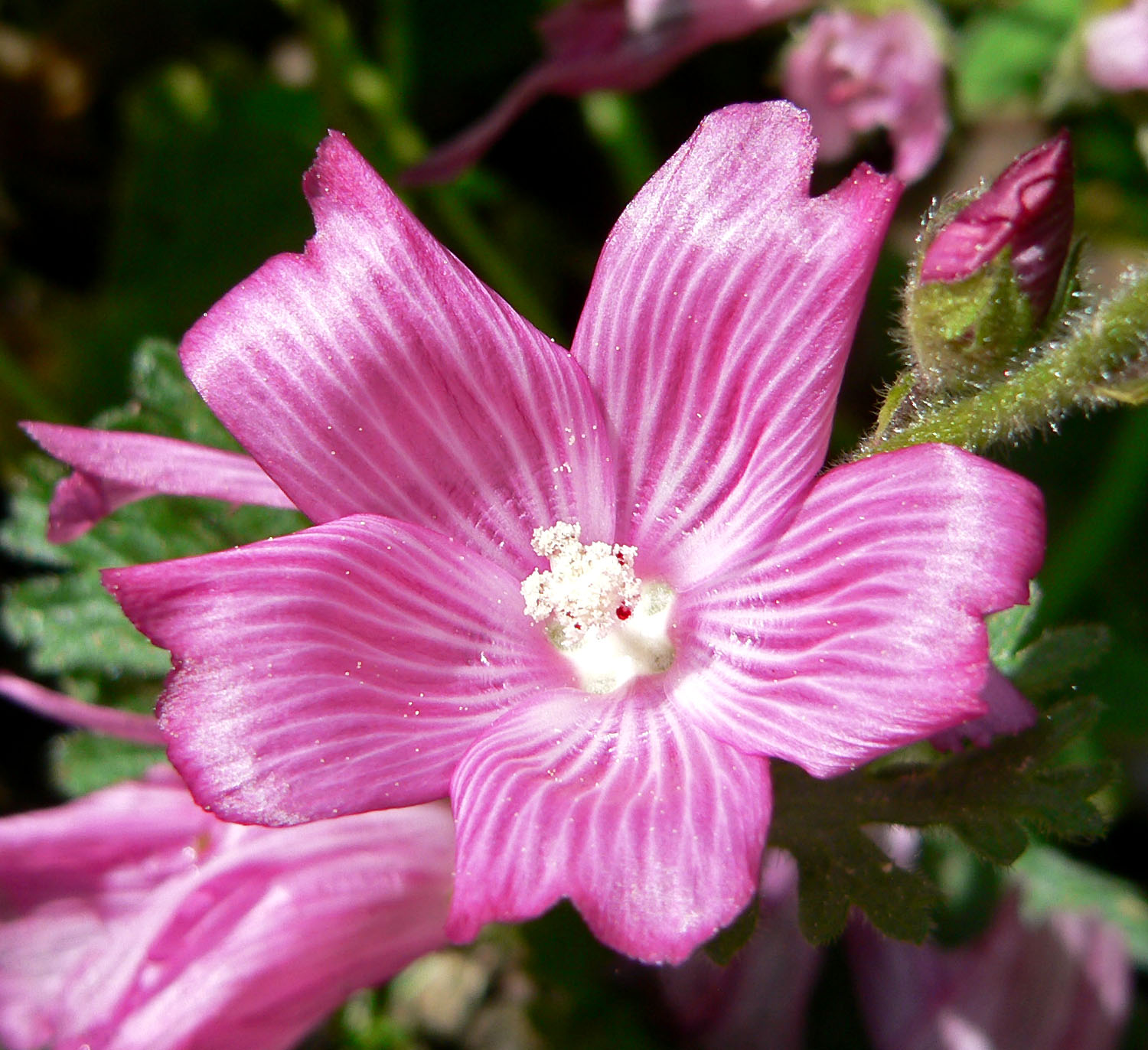
Sidalcea malviflora
