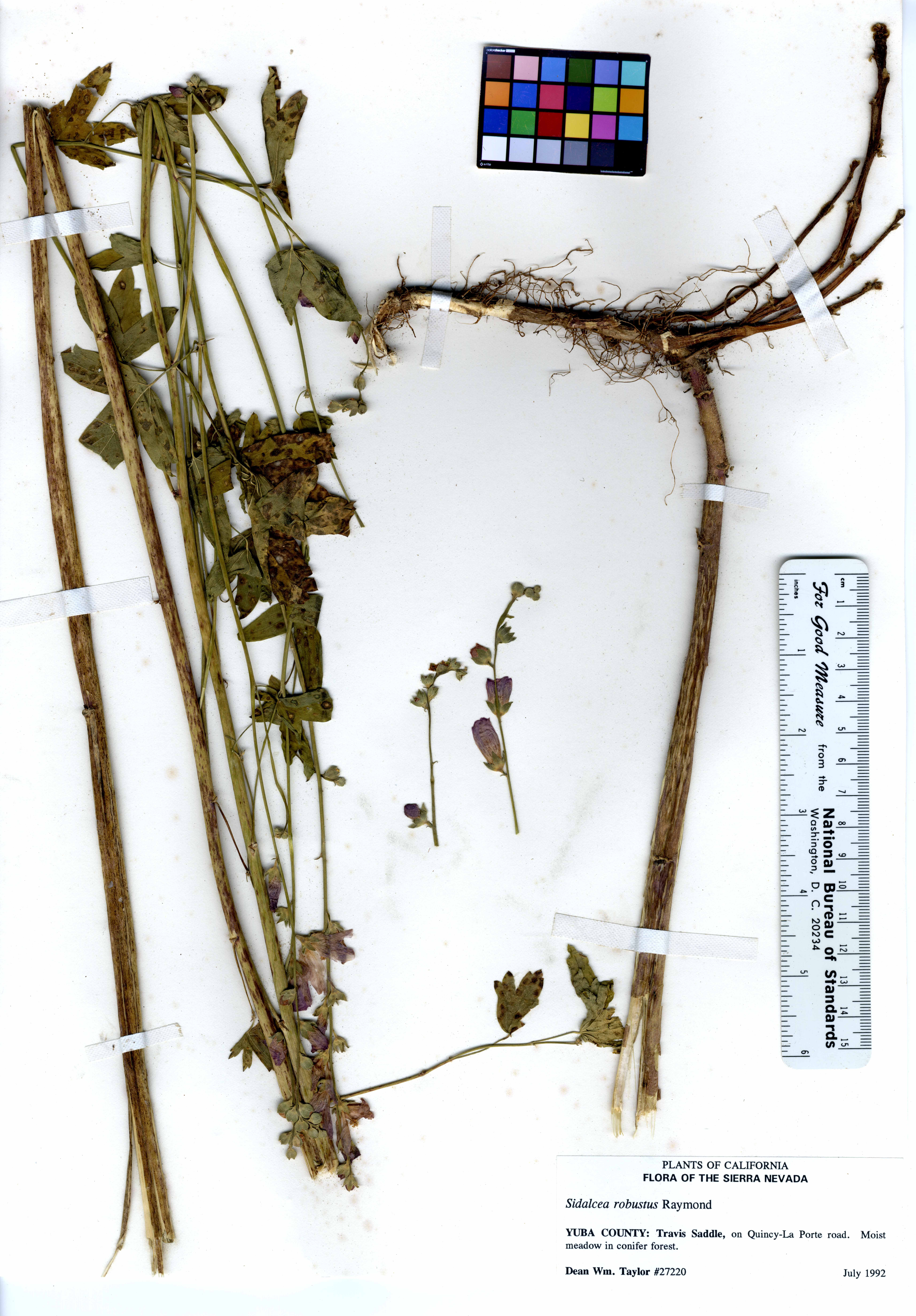

Conservation status
- Imperiled (NatureServe)

Scientific classification
- Kingdom: Plantae
- Clade: Tracheophytes
- Clade: Angiosperms
- Clade: Eudicots
- Clade: Rosids
- Order: Malvales
- Family: Malvaceae
- Genus: Sidalcea
- Species: S. robusta

Binomial name
- Sidalcea robusta A.Heller ex Roush

= Sidalcea robusta =

Species of flowering plant

Sidalcea robusta is an uncommon species of flowering plant in the mallow family known by the common name Butte County checkerbloom.

== Description ==
This rhizomatous perennial herb produces a sturdy stem which can exceed a meter in height. Sidalcea robusta is mostly hairless above with sparse hairs near the base. The leaves are divided into pointed lobes and have bristly hairs on their upper surfaces. The inflorescence is a long, open series of flowers which can be 30–40 cm (12–16 in) in length. The flowers each have five pale pink petals up to 3.5 cm (1.4 in) long that turn yellowish as they dry.

== Distribution ==
Sidalcea robusta is endemic to Butte County, California, where it is known from about 20 occurrences, including some near Chico. It is a resident of chaparral and woodland habitat in mountain foothills.

It is an Endangered species listed by the California Native Plant Society Inventory of Rare and Endangered Plants and The Nature Conservancy.
