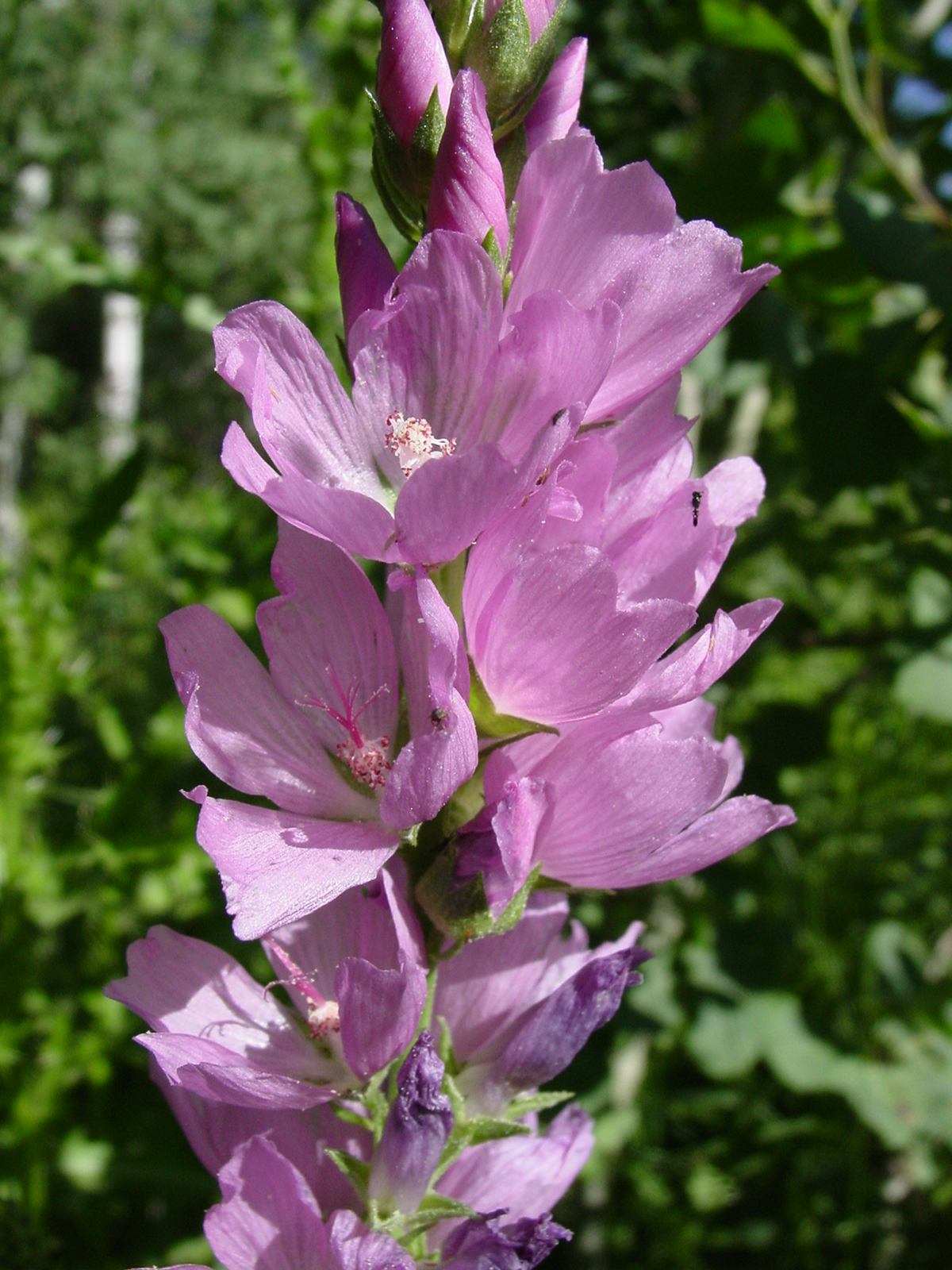

Conservation status
- Apparently Secure (NatureServe)

Scientific classification
- Kingdom: Plantae
- Clade: Tracheophytes
- Clade: Angiosperms
- Clade: Eudicots
- Clade: Rosids
- Order: Malvales
- Family: Malvaceae
- Genus: Sidalcea
- Species: S. neomexicana

Binomial name
- Sidalcea neomexicana A.Gray

Synonyms
- Sidalcea confinis Greene; Sidalcea crenulata A.Nelson; Sidalcea parviflora Greene

= Sidalcea neomexicana =

Plant species in the mallow family

Sidalcea neomexicana is a species of flowering plant in the mallow family known by the common names salt spring checkerbloom, Rocky Mountain checker-mallow, and New Mexico checker.

== Description ==
Sidalcea neomexicana is a perennial herb growing from a cluster of fleshy roots, the mostly hairless stem growing 20 to 90 centimeters tall.

The fleshy leaves are sometimes divided shallowly to deeply into lobes.

The inflorescence is a loose cluster of flowers with pink petals up to 2 centimeters long.

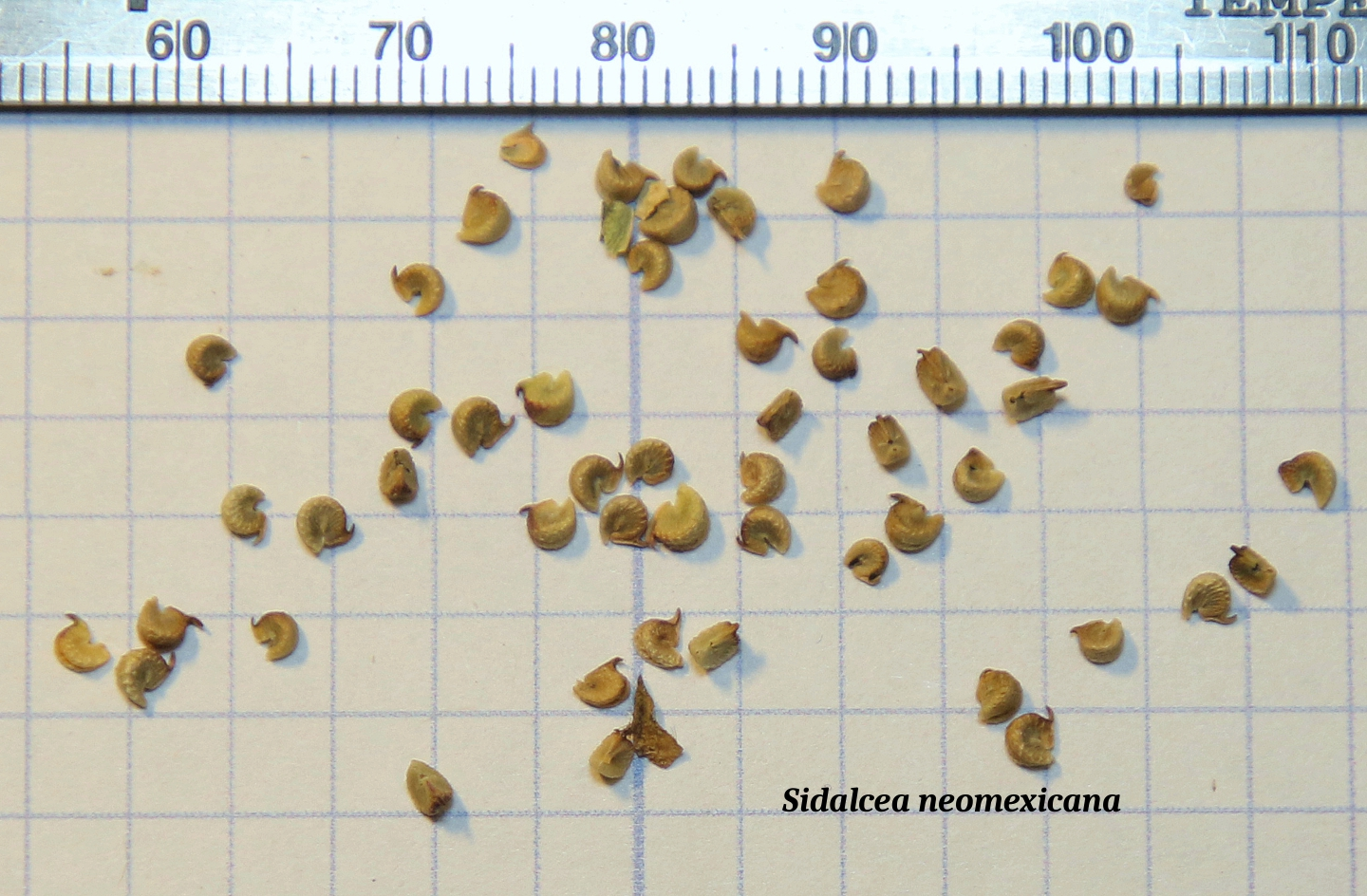
Sidalcea neomexicana seeds

== Distribution and habitat ==
The plant is native to the Western United States and northern Mexico. It can be found in a diverse number of habitat types, including chaparral and coastal sage scrub, Yellow Pine Forest and riparian zones, Creosote bush scrub, and alkali flats and other salty substrates.
