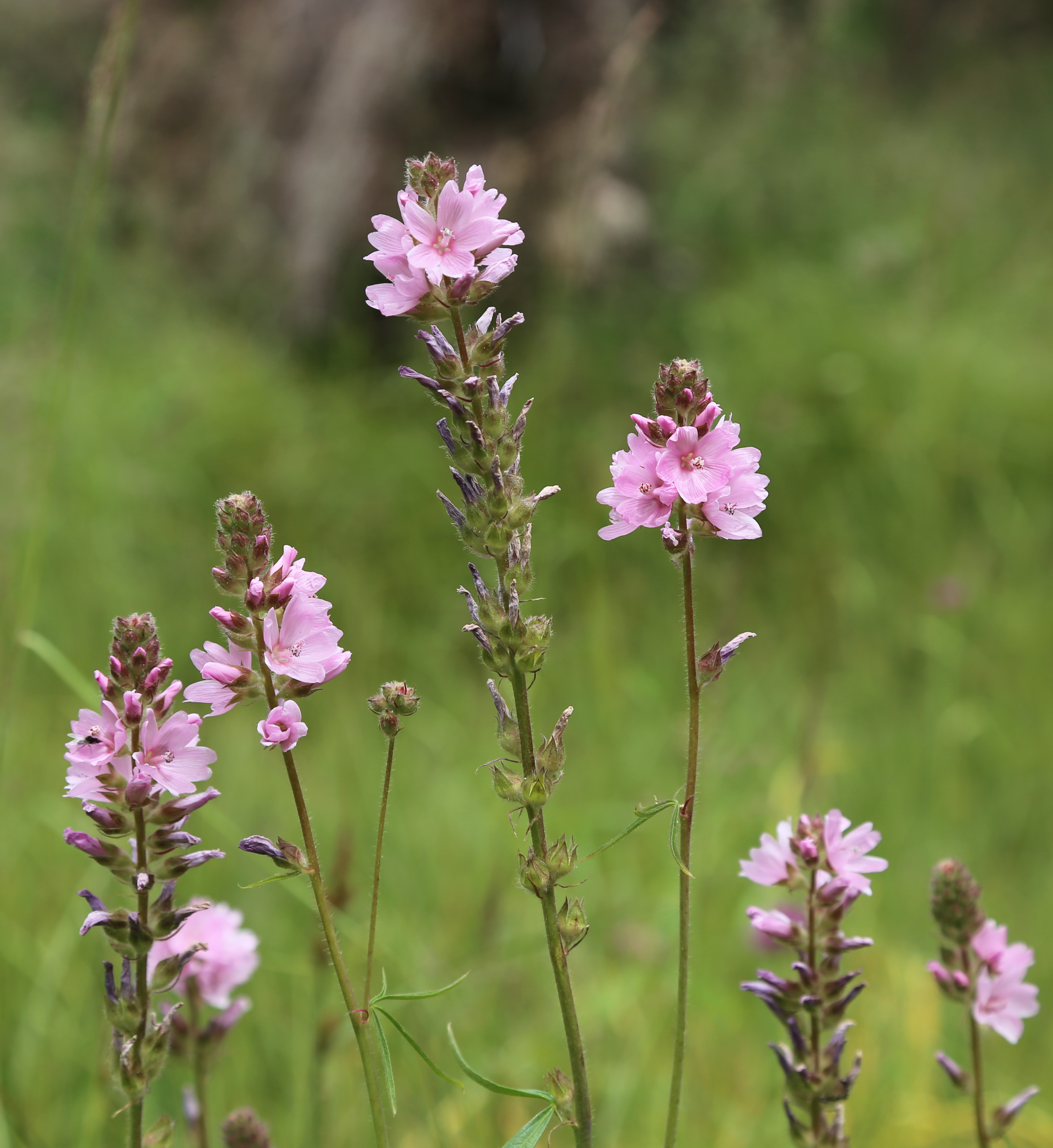

Scientific classification
- Kingdom: Plantae
- Clade: Tracheophytes
- Clade: Angiosperms
- Clade: Eudicots
- Clade: Rosids
- Order: Malvales
- Family: Malvaceae
- Genus: Sidalcea
- Species: S. oregana

Binomial name
- Sidalcea oregana (Nutt. ex Torr. & A.Gray) A.Gray

= Sidalcea oregana =

Species of flowering plant

Sidalcea oregana is a species of flowering plant in the mallow family known by the common name Oregon checkerbloom.

== Distribution ==
It is native to western North America from British Columbia to California to Utah, where it grows in a number of moist habitat types, such as marshes and meadows. The plant is somewhat variable in appearance, and the species is divided into a few subspecies; some authors also recognize varieties within subspecies. In general, this is a perennial herb growing to maximum heights well over one meter from a woody taproot.

== Description ==
Sidalcea oregana is usually hairy in texture, the hairs thick and bristly toward the base of the stem. Most of the leaves are located low on the stem, basal or on long petioles. Their blades are usually deeply divided into lobes (see image at left); upper leaves may be divided further into leaflets.

The inflorescence is a dense or open spikelike raceme of many flowers. Each flower has five pink petals up to 2 centimeters long, usually notched at the end, and a central tube of reproductive parts (see flower closeup image).

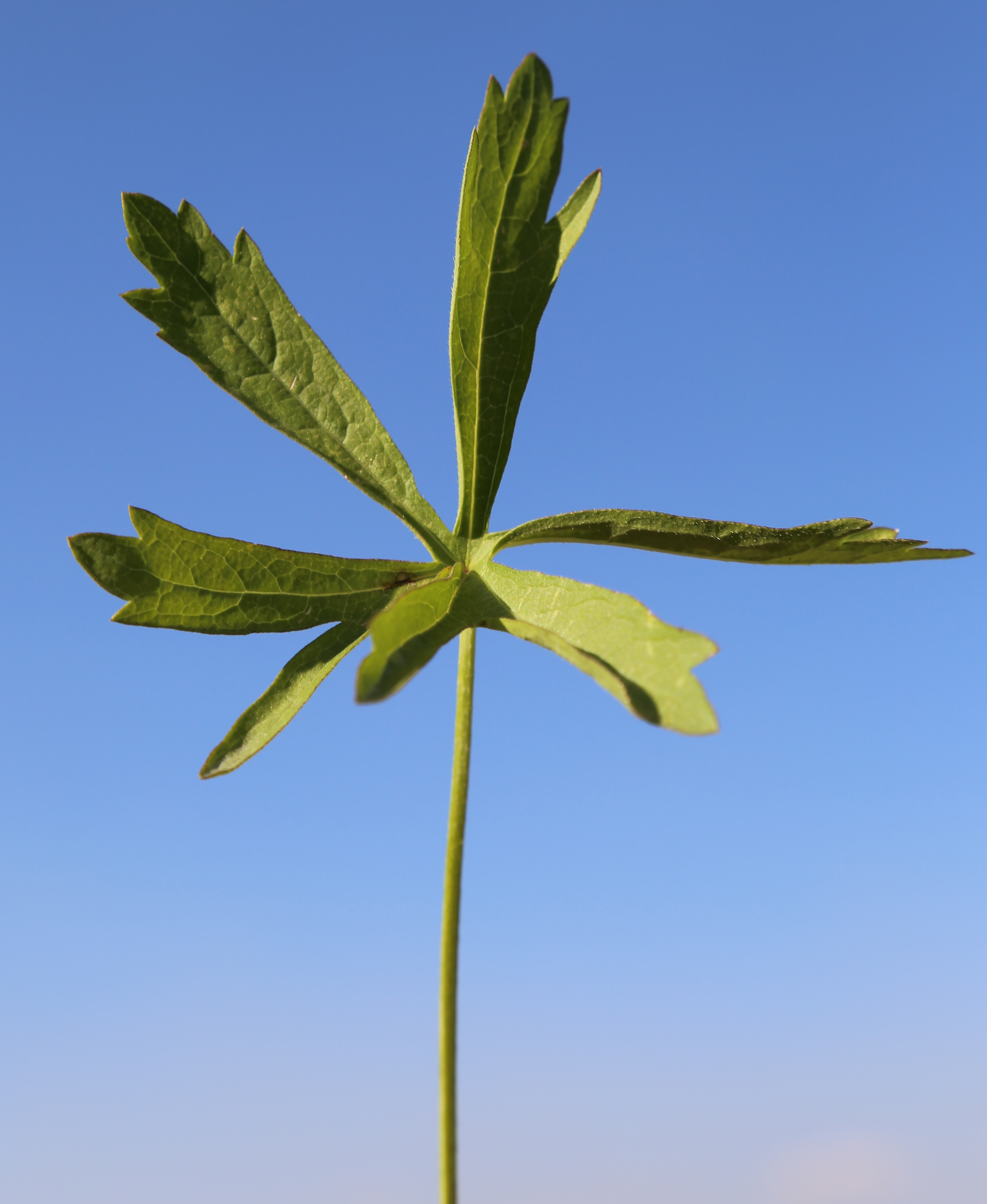
Deeply 7-lobed leaf, on long petiole.

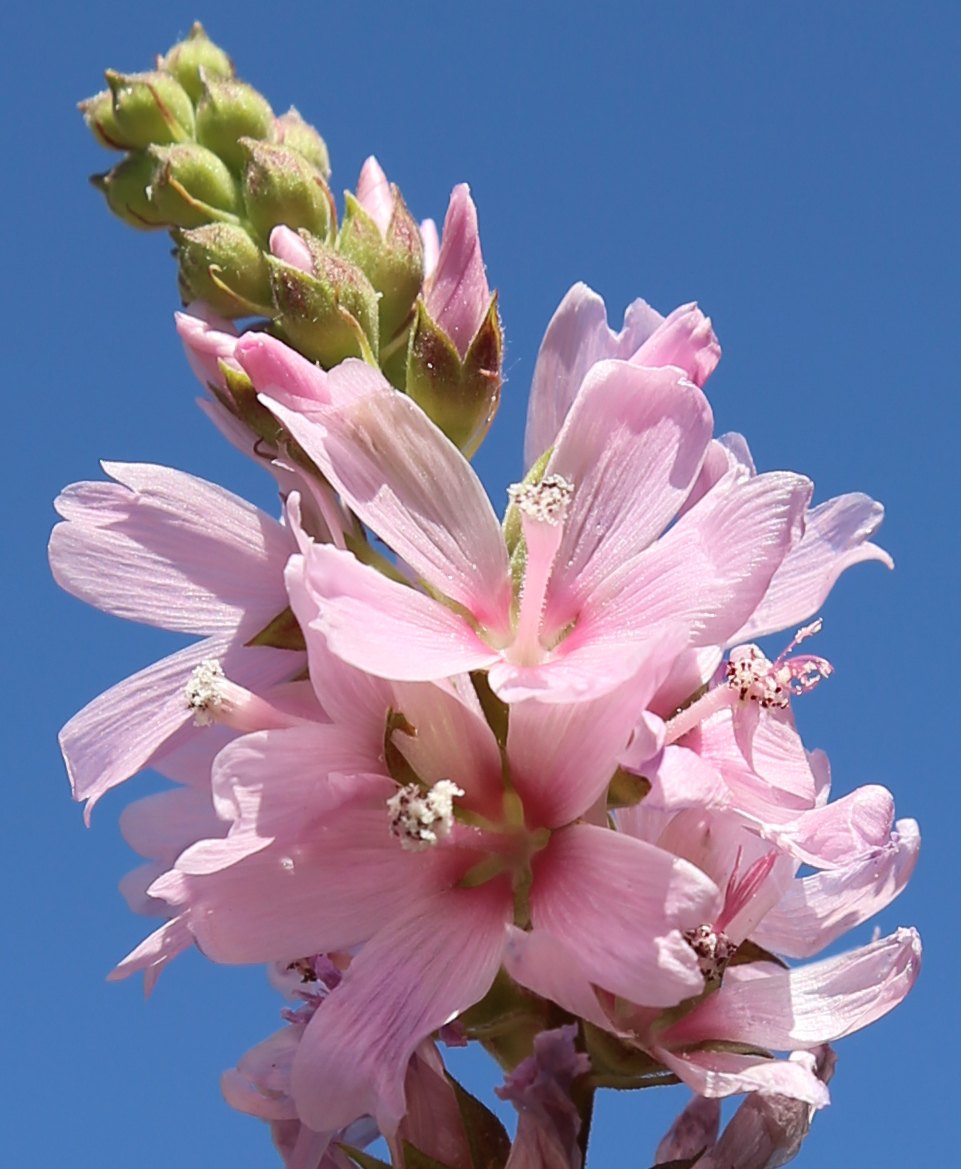
Dense flowerspike of ssp. spicata.

=== Subspecies ===
Subspecies include:

- Sidalcea oregana var. calva — Wenatchee Mountains checkermallow, endemic to the Wenatchee Mountains of Washington and a federally listed Endangered species.
- Sidalcea oregana ssp. eximia — coast checkerbloom, endemic to ~10 populations in northwestern California, a Critically endangered species on the California Native Plant Society Inventory of Rare and Endangered Plants.
- Sidalcea oregana ssp. hydrophila
- Sidalcea oregana ssp. oregana
- Sidalcea oregana ssp. spicata — spicate checkerbloom or bog mallow, widespread in meadows or streamsides of the Sierra and Cascades in California, below 10,000 ft (3,000 m).
- Sidalcea oregana ssp. valida — Kenwood Marsh checkerbloom, known only from two marshes in Sonoma County, California, a federal, state, and CNPS listed endangered species.

== Ecology ==
It is a larval host to the West Coast lady.
