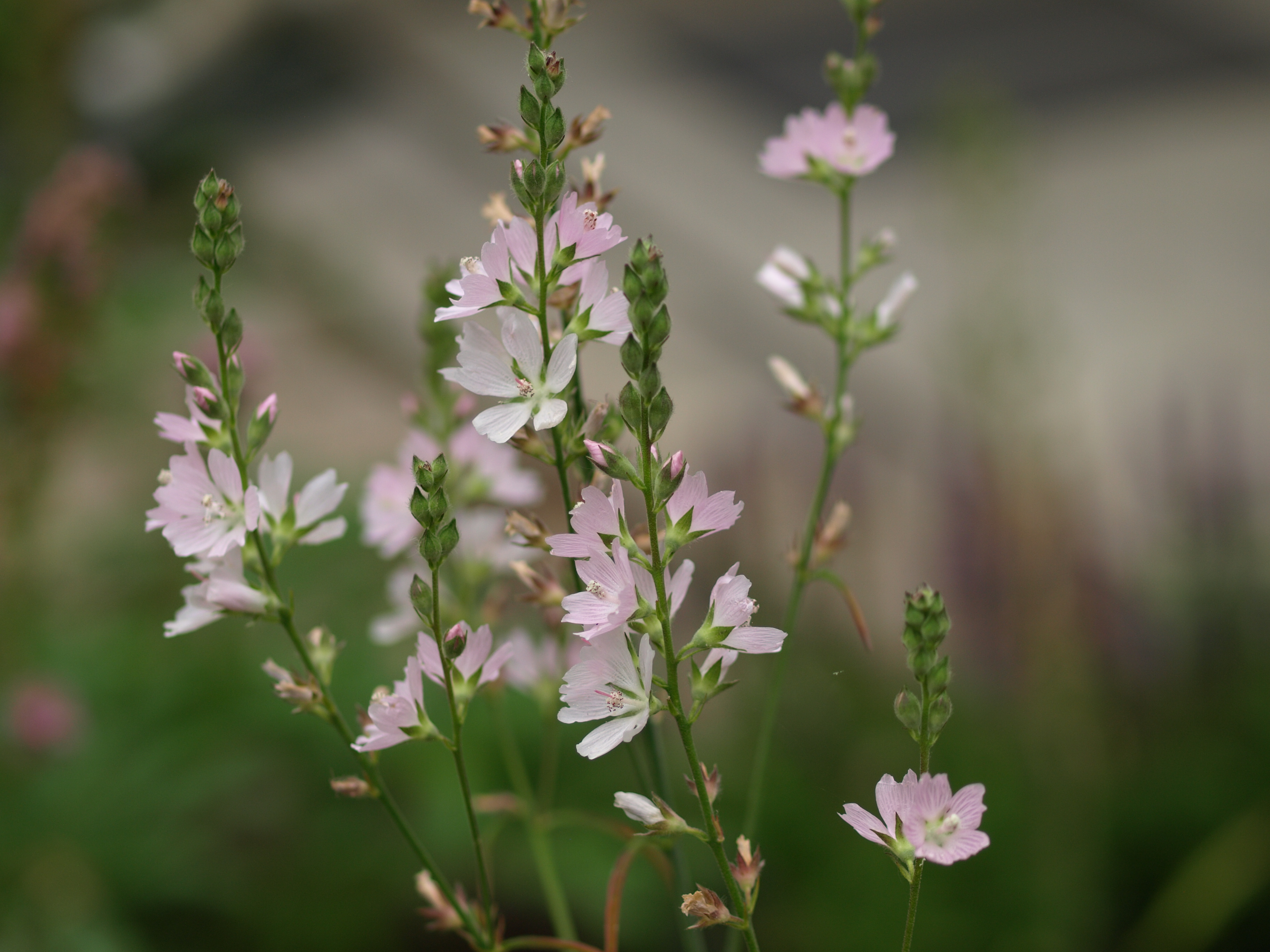
- Sidalcea Campestris inflorescence

Conservation status
- Apparently Secure (NatureServe)

Scientific classification
- Kingdom: Plantae
- Clade: Tracheophytes
- Clade: Angiosperms
- Clade: Eudicots
- Clade: Rosids
- Order: Malvales
- Family: Malvaceae
- Genus: Sidalcea
- Species: S. campestris

Binomial name
- Sidalcea campestris Greene

= Sidalcea campestris =

Species of flowering plant

Sidalcea campestris is a species of flowering plant in the mallow family known by the common name meadow checker-mallow. It is native only to portions of western Oregon, in the Pacific Northwest region of North America.

== Distribution ==
Meadow checker-mallow occurs in grassy meadows, unplowed fields, and along roadsides in the Willamette Valley. Historically native to the following Oregon Counties: Benton, Clackamas, Douglas, Lane, Linn, Marion, Multnomah, Polk, Washington, Yamhill. Currently it is found only in the central portion of its range and is locally common in the Salem area. It is not known to occur at elevations above 250 meters.

== Description ==
Sidalcea campestris is a taprooted perennial herb that grows from thick, stubby rhizomes. It has a basal rosette of toothed leaves. Its stems are erect and hollow. The flowers are five-petaled and numerous, with typically fifty or more per plant, forming in branched racemes atop stems. The flowers range in color from white to pink. Sidalcea campestris prefers moist, but well drained to dry soil and full sun to part shade.

== Ecology ==
Sidalcea campestris is an Oregon National Heritage Program plant of conservation concern, but it is not currently threatened or endangered. Uncommon in the wild, It is vulnerable to herbicide spraying due to population occurrences along fences and roadsides. Its small historic range is another concern.

Sidalcea campestris is an important component of the Willamette Valley's pollinator habitat. The flowers are a high quality source of nectar and pollen for native flies, wasps, bees and butterflies. It provides food (nectar and/or pollen) to the endangered Fender's Blue Butterfly (Plebejus icarioides fenderi) and a species of native, solitary bee (Diadasia nigrifrons). Diadasia nigrifrons are oligoleges, which means they are specialists who depend on pollen and nectar from just a few species of plants. Analysis of pollen loads of wild Diadasia nigrifrons revealed that they collect pollen exclusively from plants in the Sidalcea genus. In the Willamette Valley, there are only three native Sidalcae species, which makes Sidalcea campestris important for Diadasia nigrifrons' continued survival.

== Cultivation ==
Sidalcea campestris is an attractive ornamental plant that flowers from June to August. It grows readily from seeds, by dividing a mature plant, or by transplanting plugs. It grows in full sun to part shade and can be up to 2 feet wide at maturity. Flower stems can reach 2-6 feet tall. Sidalcea campestris is highly drought tolerant and will tolerate seasonally dry soils.
