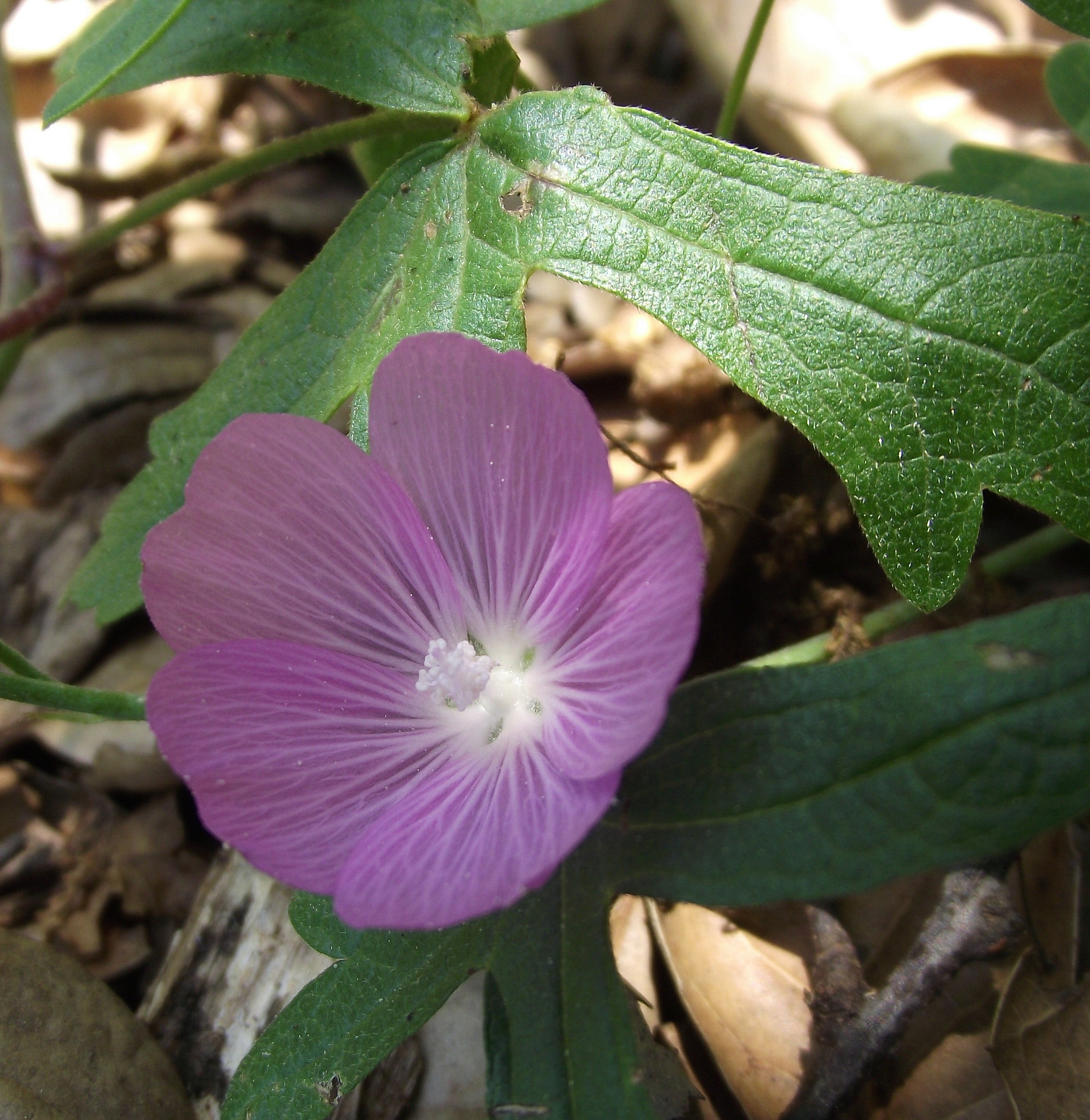

Scientific classification
- Kingdom: Plantae
- Clade: Tracheophytes
- Clade: Angiosperms
- Clade: Eudicots
- Clade: Rosids
- Order: Malvales
- Family: Malvaceae
- Genus: Sidalcea
- Species: S. glaucescens

Binomial name
- Sidalcea glaucescens Greene

= Sidalcea glaucescens =

Species of flowering plant

Sidalcea glaucescens is a species of flowering plant in the mallow family known by the common name waxy checkerbloom.

== Distribution ==
It is native to California, where it grows in the southernmost mountains of the Cascade Range and the Sierra Nevada, its distribution extending just over the border into Nevada. It can be found in mountain meadow habitats of yellow pine forest, red fir forest, lodgepole forest, and subalpine forest.

== Description ==
Sidalcea glaucescens is a perennial herb grows from a thick taproot and caudex unit, producing a slender, waxy stem up to 70 centimetres (28 in) long. The leaves are deeply divided into about five lobes which may be forked or edged with smaller lobes.

The inflorescence is a loose panicle of several flowers with pink or purplish petals 1 to 2 centimeters long. The bloom period is June to August.
