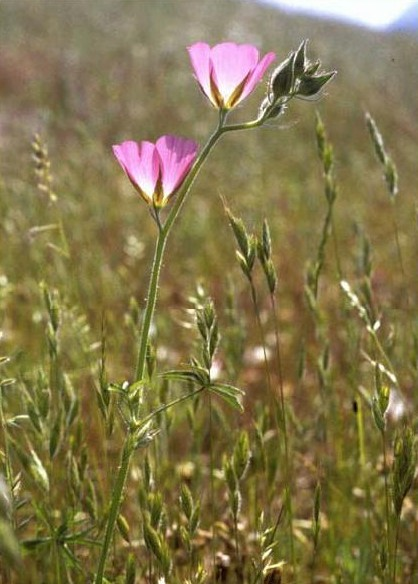

Conservation status
- Endangered (ESA)

Scientific classification
- Kingdom: Plantae
- Clade: Tracheophytes
- Clade: Angiosperms
- Clade: Eudicots
- Clade: Rosids
- Order: Malvales
- Family: Malvaceae
- Genus: Sidalcea
- Species: S. keckii

Binomial name
- Sidalcea keckii Wiggins

= Sidalcea keckii =

Species of flowering plant

Sidalcea keckii is a rare species of flowering plant in the mallow family, known by the common names Keck's checkerbloom and Keck's checkermallow.

== Distribution ==
The plant is endemic to California, where it is known from the Inner Northern California Coast Ranges and Southern Sierra Nevada foothills.

Southern Sierra

Three recent occurrences in the southern Sierra, all of which may have been extirpated by now.

The plant was thought extinct in the southern Sierra until it was rediscovered at one site in Tulare County in 1992. This site, which was located on private land, has since been converted for orange groves, possibly eliminating the plant. The owner of the land has not allowed any searches for the plant since then, but the area is considered critical habitat for this federally listed endangered species.

== Description ==
Sidalcea keckii is an annual herb growing up to 35 centimeters tall which is bristly from top to base. The leaves have blades shallowly edged or deeply divided into lobes, the upper blades with toothed edges.

The inflorescence is a dense cluster of a few flowers with deep pink petals measuring 1 to 2 centimeters long. Each flower has a calyx of pointed green sepals which may be streaked with pink. The bloom period is April and May.
