= Eva Myrtelle Roush =

Botanist (1886–1954)

Eva Myrtelle (Fling) Roush (1886–1954) was an American botanist noted for her study of Sidalcea and her work at the Arnold Arboretum. In 1930, she received her doctorate degree in botany from Washington University in St. Louis. The standard author abbreviation Roush is used to indicate this person as the author when citing a botanical name.
