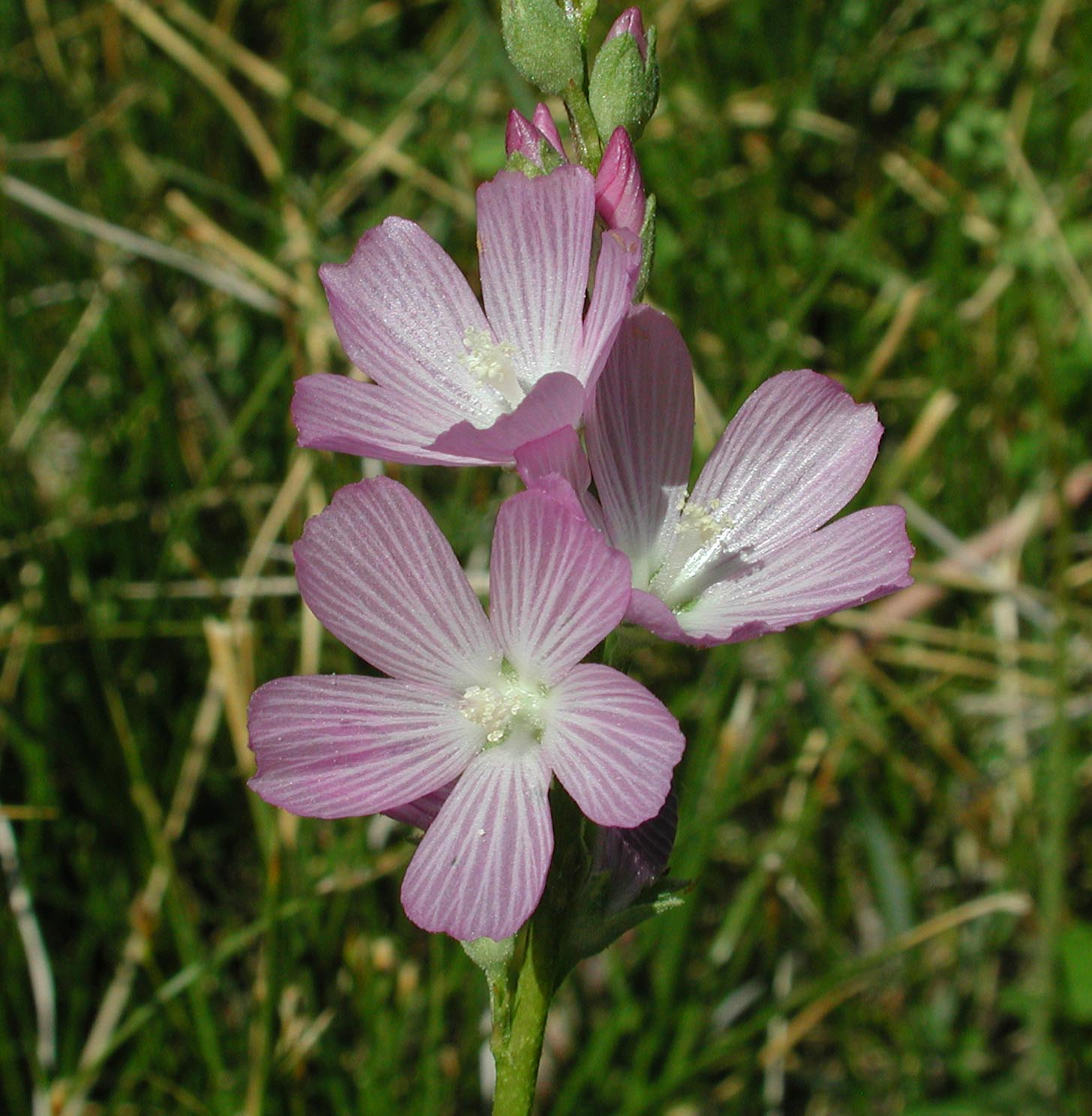

Conservation status
- Imperiled (NatureServe)

Scientific classification
- Kingdom: Plantae
- Clade: Tracheophytes
- Clade: Angiosperms
- Clade: Eudicots
- Clade: Rosids
- Order: Malvales
- Family: Malvaceae
- Genus: Sidalcea
- Species: S. covillei

Binomial name
- Sidalcea covillei Greene

= Sidalcea covillei =

Species of flowering plant

Sidalcea covillei is an uncommon species of flowering plant in the mallow family known by the common names Owens Valley sidalcea, and Owens Valley checkerbloom. It is endemic to the Owens Valley of Inyo County, California, where it grows on alkali flats and in alkaline meadows and springs. While it is limited to this single valley, it is known from 42 sites there, and several populations are relatively large, but are greatly diminished by historical standards.

This is a perennial herb growing from one or more fleshy roots and reaching maximum heights between 20 and 60 centimeters. The stem is hairy, with rough, bristly hairs near the base and finer ones higher up. The leaves have blades deeply divided into narrow linear lobes, almost divided into leaflets. The leaves are fleshy and waxy in texture. The inflorescence is an open panicle of several flowers each with five pinkish purple petals up to 1.5 centimeters long. The leaves and flower sepals are coated in tiny branching hairs.

Threats to this species include a dropping water table, which prevents water from accumulating at the surface in the plant's alkaline-seep habitat, moving the water out of reach of the plant, as well as grazing, the most important threat to the species according to NatureServe.

The species is named after the American botanist Frederick Vernon Coville.
