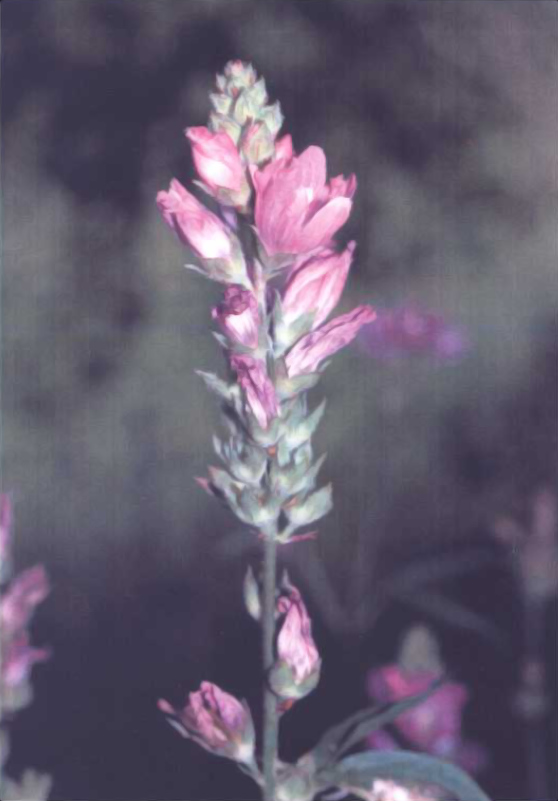

Conservation status
- Endangered (ESA)

Scientific classification
- Kingdom: Plantae
- Clade: Tracheophytes
- Clade: Angiosperms
- Clade: Eudicots
- Clade: Rosids
- Order: Malvales
- Family: Malvaceae
- Genus: Sidalcea
- Species: S. oregana
- Variety: S. o. var. calva

Trinomial name
- Sidalcea oregana var. calva C.L.Hitchc.

= Sidalcea oregana var. calva =

Wenatchee Mountains checker-mallow

Species of flowering plant

Sidalcea oregana var. calva, the Wenatchee Mountains checker-mallow, is a very rare flowering plant variety that occurs only in five locations in the Wenatchee Mountains of Chelan County, Washington, United States. The plant has been placed on the Endangered species list. As of 2004, the population of the species was 11,000 individual plants.

Sidalcea oregana var. calva is a perennial herb in the mallow family Malvaceae. The species has a stout taproot that branches at the rootcrown and gives rise to several stems that are 20 to 150 centimeters (8 to 60 inches) tall. Plant stems vary from glabrous (lacking hairs and glands) to pubescent (hairy) or stellate (with star-shaped hairs) below and are finely stellate above. The leaves are somewhat thick and fleshy with long petioles (leaf stalks). The leaves are dimorphic (have two forms) with the lower (basal) leaves having more shallow lobes. The flowers have light- to deep pink petals 1 to 2 centimeters (0.4 to 0.8 inch) long. The flowers are borne on stalks ranging from 1 to 10 millimeters (0.04 to 0.4 inch) in length. The calyx (outer whorl of floral parts) ranges from uniformly finely stellate to bristly with a mixture of longer, simple to four-rayed, spreading hairs sometimes as long as 2.5 to 3 millimeters (0.1 to 0.12 inch).

The inflorescence (arrangement of the flowers) consists of one to several loosely flowered racemes (stalked flowers arranged along a single stem) S. oregana var. calva is similar in appearance to S. oregana var. procera, which occurs in the same geographic region. S. oregana var. calva can be distinguished from var. procera by the presence of the hairs on the margins of the calyx lobes and by its large, somewhat fleshy, basal leaves, which are smooth to the touch on both surfaces.

The historical range covered an area of approximately 17.7 by 4.8 kilometers (11 by 3 miles), extending south-southeasterly from Leavenworth, Washington, to the area now known as Camas Meadows. Most of the historical records of this species are based upon occurrences in the Icicle and Peshastin Creek watersheds.
