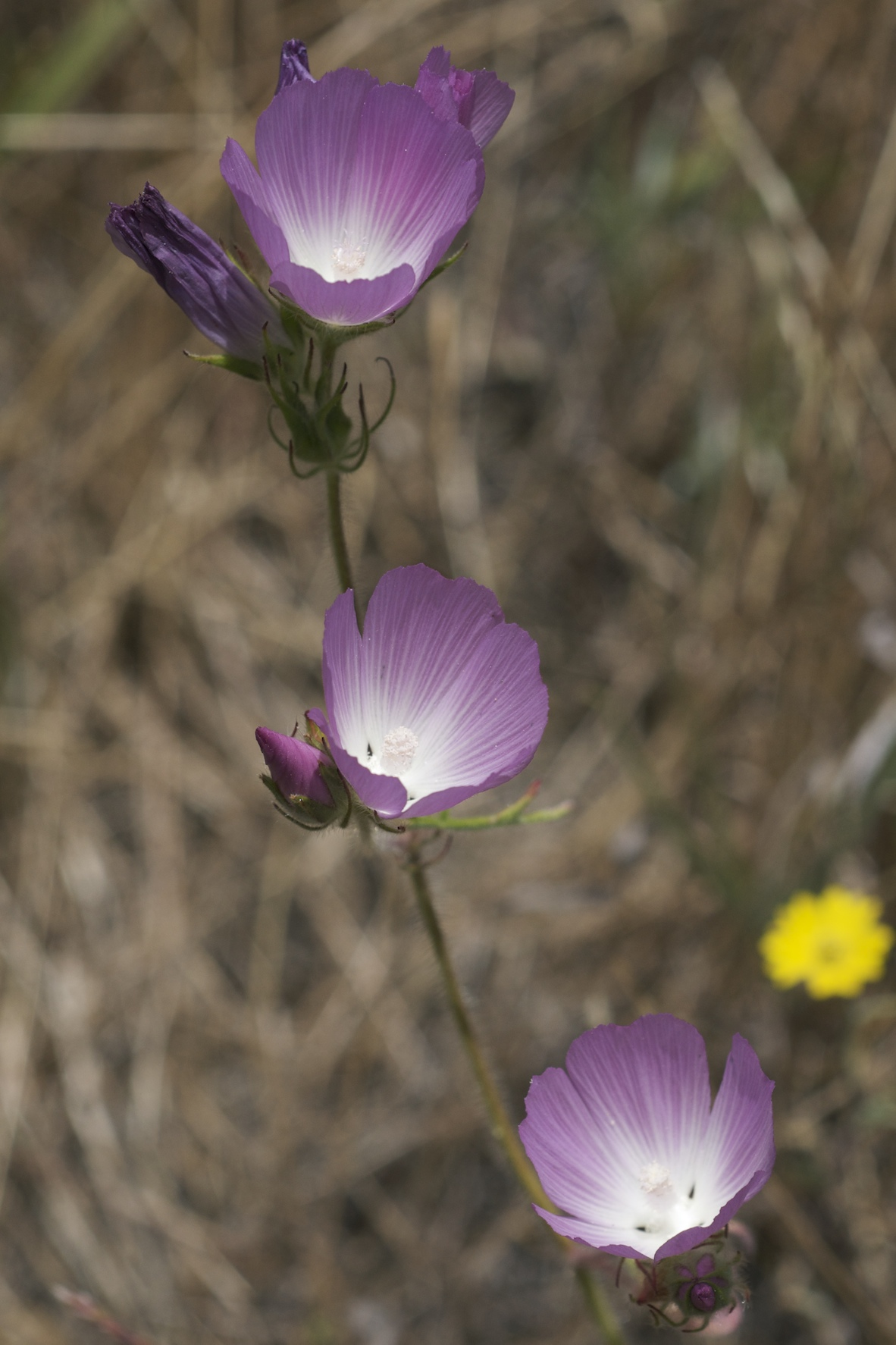

Scientific classification
- Kingdom: Plantae
- Clade: Tracheophytes
- Clade: Angiosperms
- Clade: Eudicots
- Clade: Rosids
- Order: Malvales
- Family: Malvaceae
- Genus: Sidalcea
- Species: S. diploscypha

Binomial name
- Sidalcea diploscypha (Torr. & A.Gray) A.Gray

= Sidalcea diploscypha =

Species of flowering plant

Sidalcea diploscypha is a species of flowering plant in the mallow family known by the common name fringed checkerbloom. It is endemic to California, where it grows in the woodlands and valleys of the central part of the state.

== Description ==
Sidalcea diploscypha is an annual herb growing up to 40 to 60 centimeters tall with a hairy to bristly stem. The leaves have blades deeply divided into narrow, forking lobes covered in bristly hairs.

The inflorescence is a crowded panicle of several flowers. The flower has five pink petals, each with a slight fringe on the tip and sometimes with dark coloration at the base. The petals can be up to 3.5 centimeters long.
