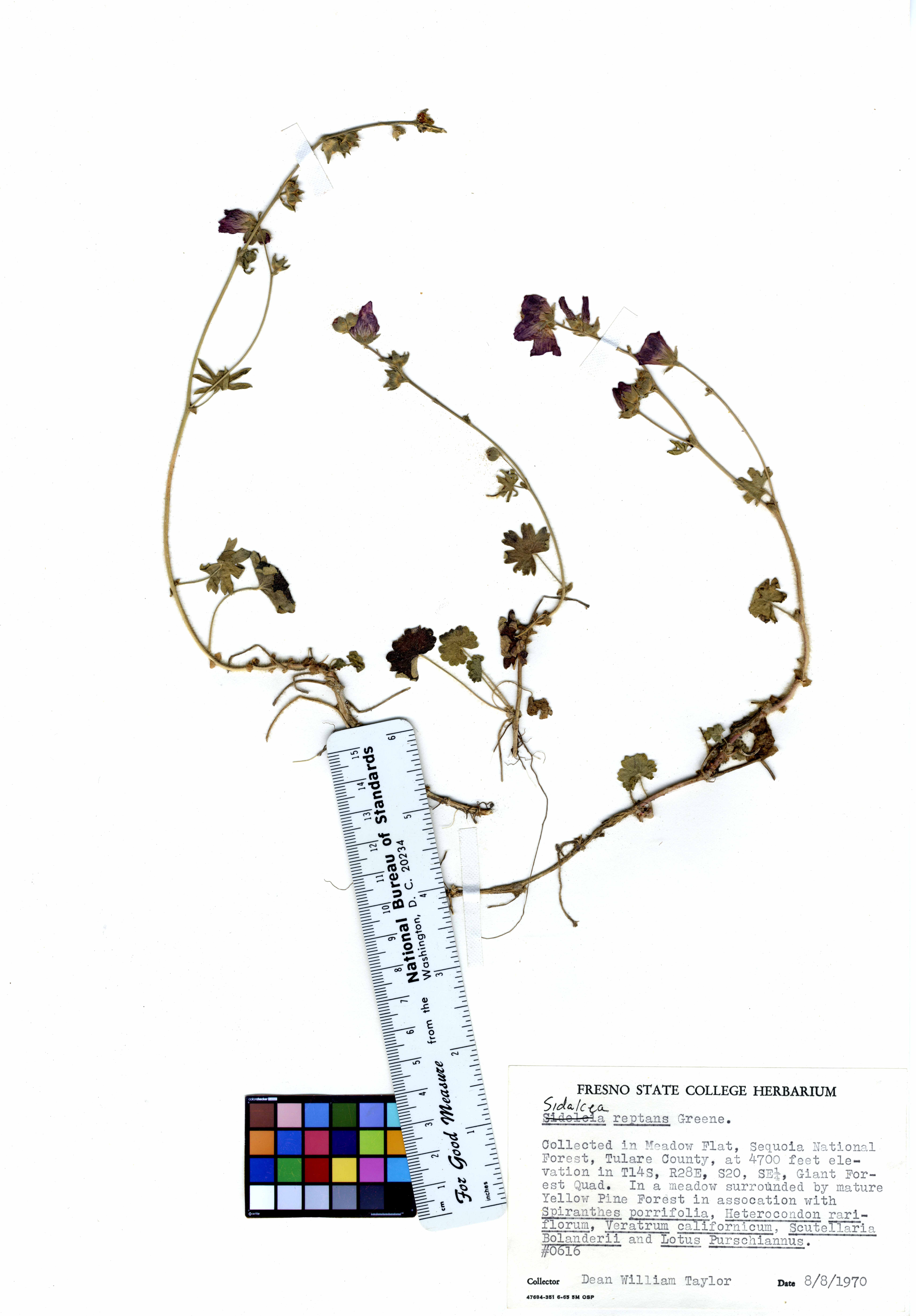

Scientific classification
- Kingdom: Plantae
- Clade: Tracheophytes
- Clade: Angiosperms
- Clade: Eudicots
- Clade: Rosids
- Order: Malvales
- Family: Malvaceae
- Genus: Sidalcea
- Species: S. reptans

Binomial name
- Sidalcea reptans Greene

= Sidalcea reptans =

Species of flowering plant

Sidalcea reptans is a species of flowering plant in the mallow family known by the common name Sierra checkerbloom and Sierra checker mallow.

== Distribution ==
The plant is endemic to California, where it can be found throughout the Sierra Nevada at 1,120–2,000 metres (3,670–6,560 ft) in elevation, especially the central peaks of the range. It grows in moist and dry habitat types in the mountains, in meadows of yellow pine forest and red fir forest.

== Description ==
Sidalcea reptans is a rhizomatous perennial herb reaching up to 0.5 metres (1.6 ft) tall. Lower portions of the stem sometimes root when in contact with moist substrate. It is coated in long, bristly hairs.

The leaf blades are also bristly. They vary in shape, the lower ones barely lobed and borne on long petioles, and the higher ones often deeply cut into lobes.

The inflorescence is a long, open series of flowers with pink to lavender petals up to 2 centimeters in length. The bloom period is June to August.
