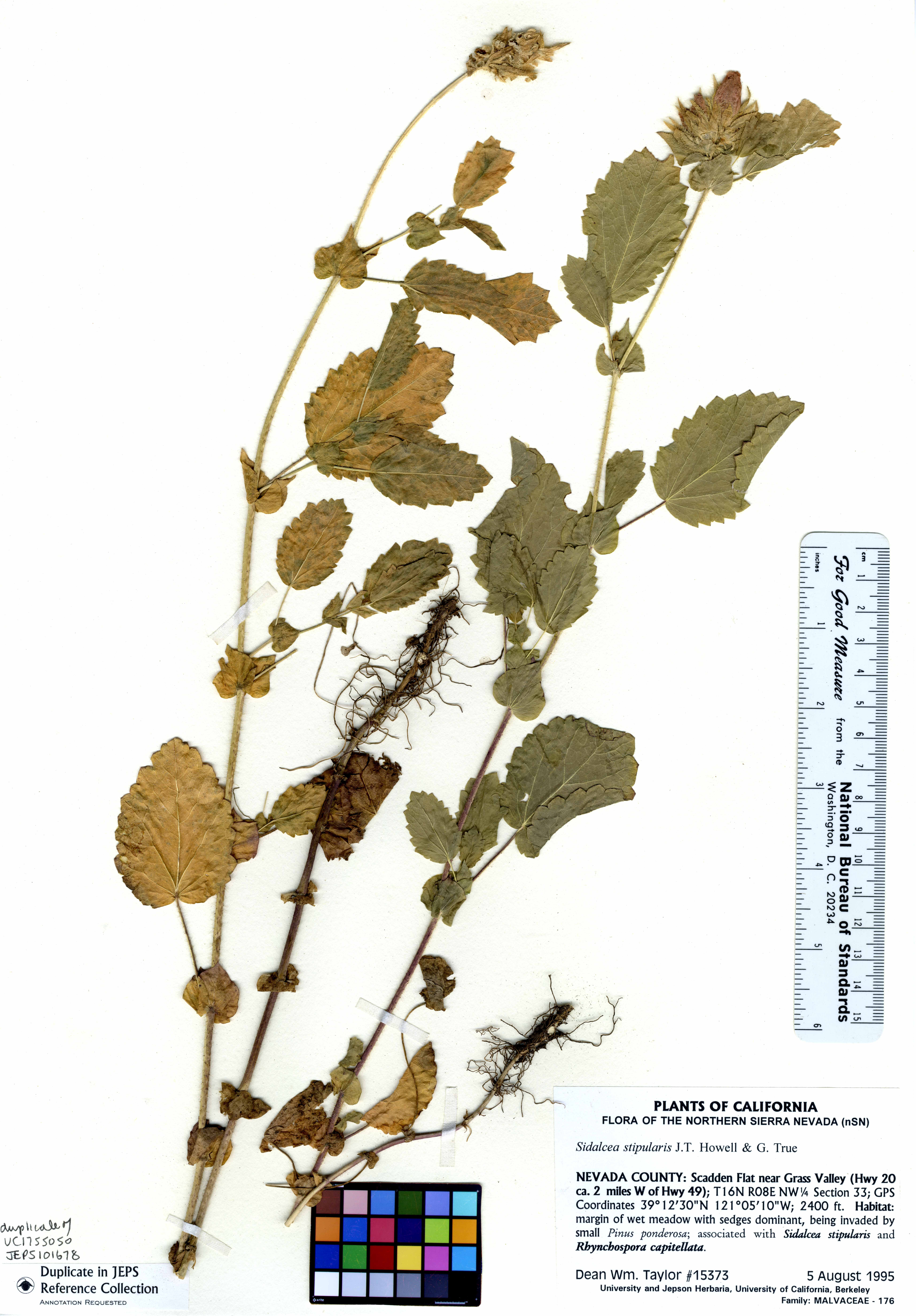

Conservation status
- Critically Imperiled (NatureServe)

Scientific classification
- Kingdom: Plantae
- Clade: Tracheophytes
- Clade: Angiosperms
- Clade: Eudicots
- Clade: Rosids
- Order: Malvales
- Family: Malvaceae
- Genus: Sidalcea
- Species: S. stipularis

Binomial name
- Sidalcea stipularis J.T.Howell & G.H.True

= Sidalcea stipularis =

Species of flowering plant

Sidalcea stipularis is a rare species of flowering plant in the mallow family, known by the common name Scadden Flat checkerbloom.

The plant is endemic to Nevada County in eastern California. It is known from only two occurrences on Scadden Flat in the Sierra Nevada foothills, near Grass Valley. It grows in marshy habitats.

== Description ==
Sidalcea stipularis is a rhizomatous perennial herb, producing a bristle-haired stem up to 65 centimeters tall.

The leaves have oval, unlobed blades on petioles and are evenly spaced along the stem. Each is accompanied by short stipules.

The inflorescence is a headlike cluster of flowers with a cuplike skirt of hairy bracts. Each flower has five pink petals about 1.5 centimeters long each.

== Conservation ==
Threats to this rare species include the invasion of Himalayan blackberry (Rubus armeniacus) into its habitat. One of the two occurrences is next to a road where there is heavy CalTrans activity.

The plant has no federal protection but it is a state-listed endangered species in California, which means that killing or possessing this species is prohibited unless permitted by the California Department of Fish and Game (California Fish and Game Code Section 2080).
