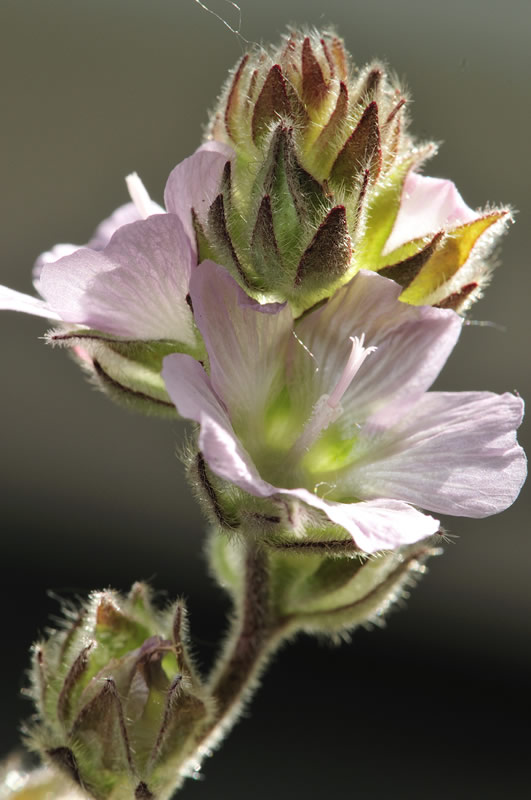
- ssp. anomala

Conservation status
- Imperiled (NatureServe)

Scientific classification
- Kingdom: Plantae
- Clade: Tracheophytes
- Clade: Angiosperms
- Clade: Eudicots
- Clade: Rosids
- Order: Malvales
- Family: Malvaceae
- Genus: Sidalcea
- Species: S. hickmanii

Binomial name
- Sidalcea hickmanii Greene

= Sidalcea hickmanii =

Species of plant

Sidalcea hickmanii is a species of flowering plant in the mallow family known generally by the common name chaparral checkerbloom.

== Distribution ==
Sidalcea hickmanii is endemic to California, where it grows in the Central Coast Ranges, the Transverse Ranges and parts of the northern coast. There are four subspecies, most of which are separated geographically. The plant grows in chaparral and other habitat, sometimes on serpentine soils.

== Description ==
This perennial herb produces a rough-haired stem up to a meter tall with a woody caudex at the base. The leaves have wide, fan-shaped blades which have rippled edges or divisions into narrow lobes. The inflorescence is an array of several racemes of flowers. Each has pinkish to purplish petals up to 2.5 centimeters long.

=== Subspecies ===
- Sidalcea hickmanii ssp. anomala - Cuesta Pass checkerbloom is a rare subspecies known only from the vicinity of the Hwy. 101 Cuesta Pass in the southern Santa Lucia Mountains, in San Luis Obispo County, where it is limited to serpentine substrates. It has deeply lobed to almost compound leaves. While rare it becomes locally abundant in areas recently burned by wildfire.
- Sidalcea hickmanii ssp. hickmanii - Hickman's checkerbloom is limited to the Santa Lucia Mountains of Monterey County.
- Sidalcea hickmanii ssp. parishii - Parish's checkerbloom is a rare subspecies which has a disjunct distribution in the Transverse Ranges. It is known from the Santa Ynez Mountains north of Santa Barbara, as well as the San Bernardino Mountains on the inland eastern side of the greater Los Angeles Basin area.
- Sidalcea hickmanii ssp. viridis - Marin checkerbloom is known from Marin County and the northern San Francisco Bay Area, several hundred miles from the other subspecies. This subspecies is possibly extinct.
