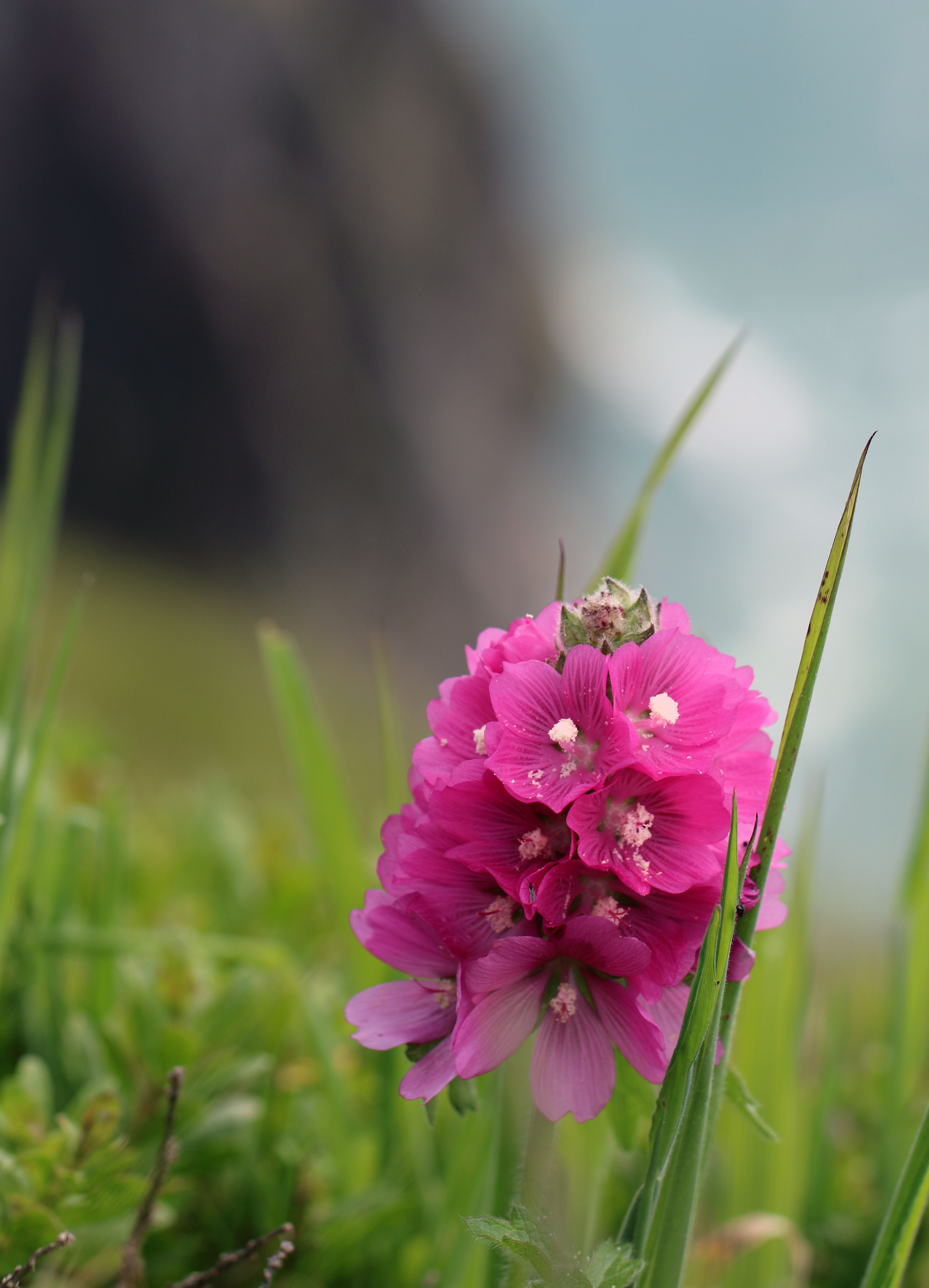

Scientific classification
- Kingdom: Plantae
- Clade: Tracheophytes
- Clade: Angiosperms
- Clade: Eudicots
- Clade: Rosids
- Order: Malvales
- Family: Malvaceae
- Genus: Sidalcea
- Species: S. hirsuta

Binomial name
- Sidalcea hirsuta A.Gray ex Benth.

= Sidalcea hirsuta =

Species of flowering plant

Sidalcea hirsuta is a species of flowering plant in the mallow family known by the common name hairy checkerbloom.

It is endemic to California, where it grows in seasonally wet habitat throughout the north-central part of the state, such as vernal pools. It is found in the North California Coast Ranges, the Sacramento Valley and San Joaquin Valley, and the Sierra Nevada foothills.

== Description ==
Sidalcea hirsuta is an annual herb that produces a thick stem up to 80 centimeters tall, the top parts covered in bristly hairs. The leaf blades are deeply divided into narrow linear lobes and coated in bristles.

The inflorescence is a dense cluster of flowers with pink petals up to 2.5 centimeters long.
