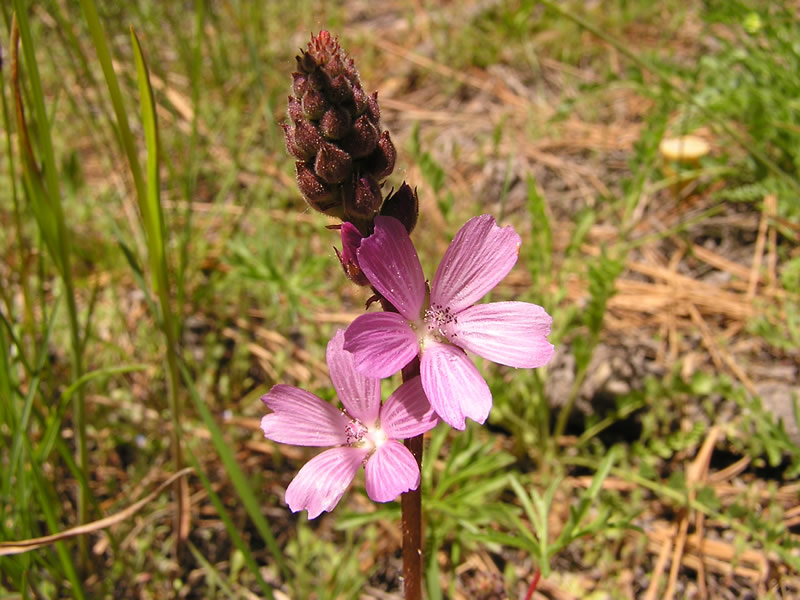

Conservation status
- Endangered (ESA)

Scientific classification
- Kingdom: Plantae
- Clade: Tracheophytes
- Clade: Angiosperms
- Clade: Eudicots
- Clade: Rosids
- Order: Malvales
- Family: Malvaceae
- Genus: Sidalcea
- Species: S. pedata

Binomial name
- Sidalcea pedata A.Gray

= Sidalcea pedata =

Species of herb

Sidalcea pedata, also called birdfoot checkerbloom or Big Bear checkerbloom, is a rare and endangered perennial herb of California. It blooms between May and July. However, it is an endemic species of California and only occurs in few places in the San Bernardino Mountains, primarily at Bear Valley, Bluff Lake. It grows at 1500–2100 m elevation in moist meadows to open woodlands and the unique pebble plain habitat of the area. Since Big Bear Valley is a resort destination, the birdfoot checkerbloom is threatened by development, vehicles and grazing.

== Description ==
Sidalcea pedata grows from a fleshy taproot and can be as tall as 40 cm. It has few stems, which are erect and somewhat stellate at the base. The leaves are basal and are ternately divided into 5–7 parts. The flowers are about 1.3 cm long and are a deep rose-pink with darker veins. They are arranged in a spike-like raceme, with the upper flowers closely crowded together.

Like other species within the genus Sidalcea, such as S. oregana ssp,S. pedata is sexually dimorphic.

== Other information ==
The birdfoot checkerbloom was listed as endangered by the state of California January 1982 and by the U.S. Federal Government August 31, 1984.
