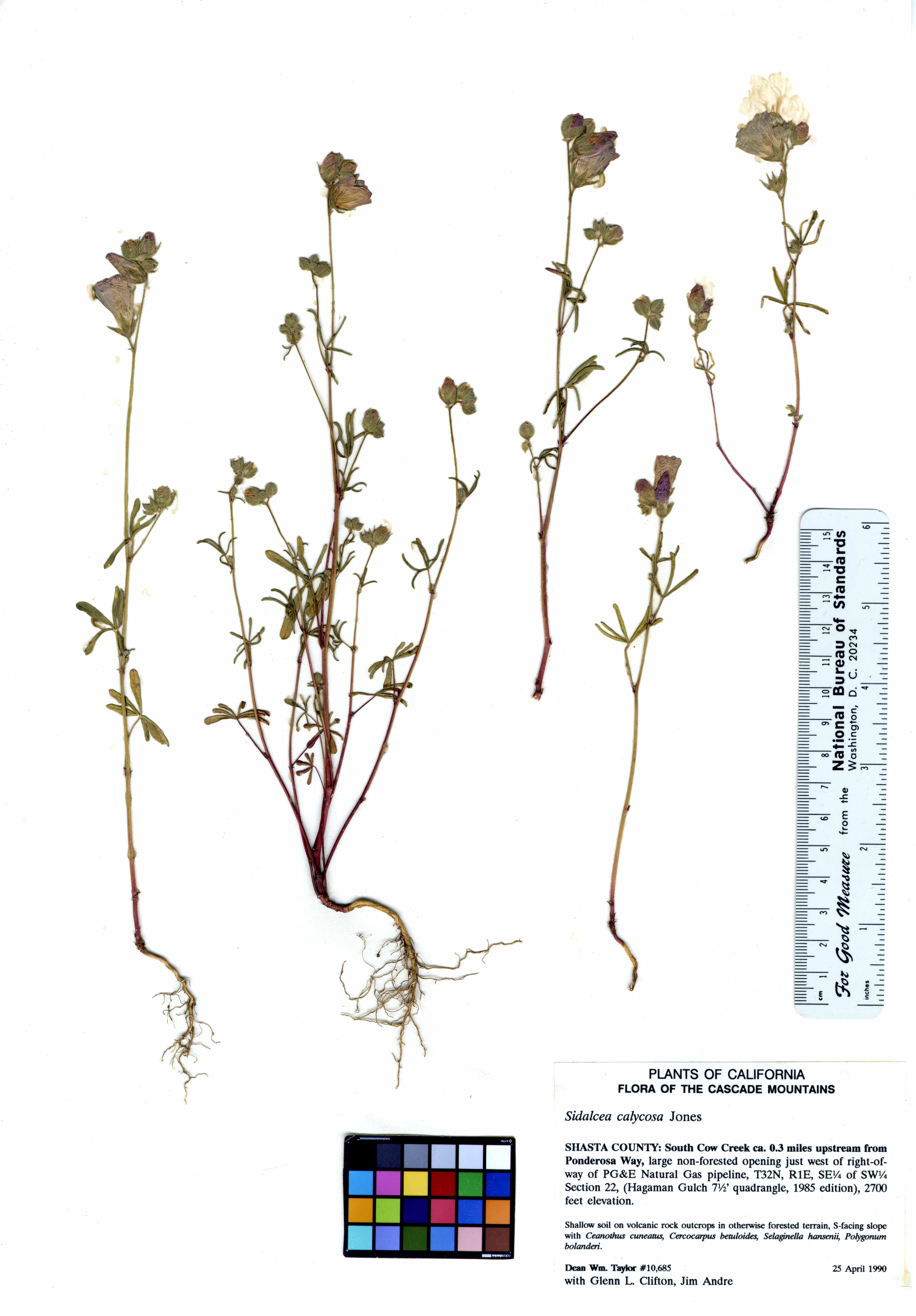

Conservation status
- Secure (NatureServe)

Scientific classification
- Kingdom: Plantae
- Clade: Tracheophytes
- Clade: Angiosperms
- Clade: Eudicots
- Clade: Rosids
- Order: Malvales
- Family: Malvaceae
- Genus: Sidalcea
- Species: S. calycosa

Binomial name
- Sidalcea calycosa M.E.Jones

= Sidalcea calycosa =

Species of flowering plant

Sidalcea calycosa is a species of flowering plant in the mallow family known by the common names annual checkerbloom, checker mallow, and vernal pool checkerbloom.

== Distribution ==
The plant is endemic to California, along the North Coast and adjacent Northern California Coast Ranges from Mendocino County to Marin County in the northern San Francisco Bay Area, and in sections of the western Sierra Nevada foothills from Butte County south into Tulare County.

It grows in wetland habitats, including marshes and vernal pools, in oak woodland and chaparral openings, grasslands, and coastal salt marsh plant communities.

== Description ==
Sidalcea calycosa is a rhizomatous herb growing 30 centimetres (12 in) to nearly 1 metre (3.3 ft) tall. Despite its common name it may be annual or perennial, depending on the subspecies. The leaves have blades deeply divided into narrow linear lobes, almost divided into leaflets.

The inflorescence is a dense, showy panicle of several flowers each with five pink, purplish, or white petals up to 2.5 centimeters long. The bloom period is April through September.

=== Subspecies ===
The two subspecies are:

- Sidalcea calycosa ssp. calycosa — annual, blooms March to June, below 1,200 metres (3,900 ft).
- Sidalcea calycosa ssp. rhizomata — Point Reyes checkerbloom, the perennial subspecies, rare and known only from a few swampy areas of the coastline below 30 metres (98 ft) in Mendocino, Sonoma, and Marin Counties.
