= Sidalcea hartwegii =

Scientific classification
- Kingdom: Plantae
- Clade: Tracheophytes
- Clade: Angiosperms
- Clade: Eudicots
- Clade: Rosids
- Order: Malvales
- Family: Malvaceae
- Genus: Sidalcea
- Species: S. hartwegii

Binomial name
- Sidalcea hartwegii A.Gray ex Benth.

Species of flowering plant

Sidalcea hartwegii is a species of flowering plant in the mallow family known by the common names valley checkerbloom and Hartweg's checkerbloom.

== Distribution ==
The plant is endemic to California, where it grows in the Sacramento Valley and adjacent foothills of the California Coast Ranges to the west, and of the Sierra Nevada to the east. It can grow in oak woodland and grassland habitats below 600 metres (2,000 ft), sometimes on serpentine soils.

== Description ==
Sidalcea hartwegii is an annual herb that produces a slender stem up to 30 centimetres (12 in) tall, mostly hairless with occasional branching hairs. The leaf blades are deeply divided into five to seven narrow linear lobes.

The inflorescence is a clustered panicle of four to six flowers, each with five purplish pink petals about 2 centimeters long. The bloom period is May and June.
