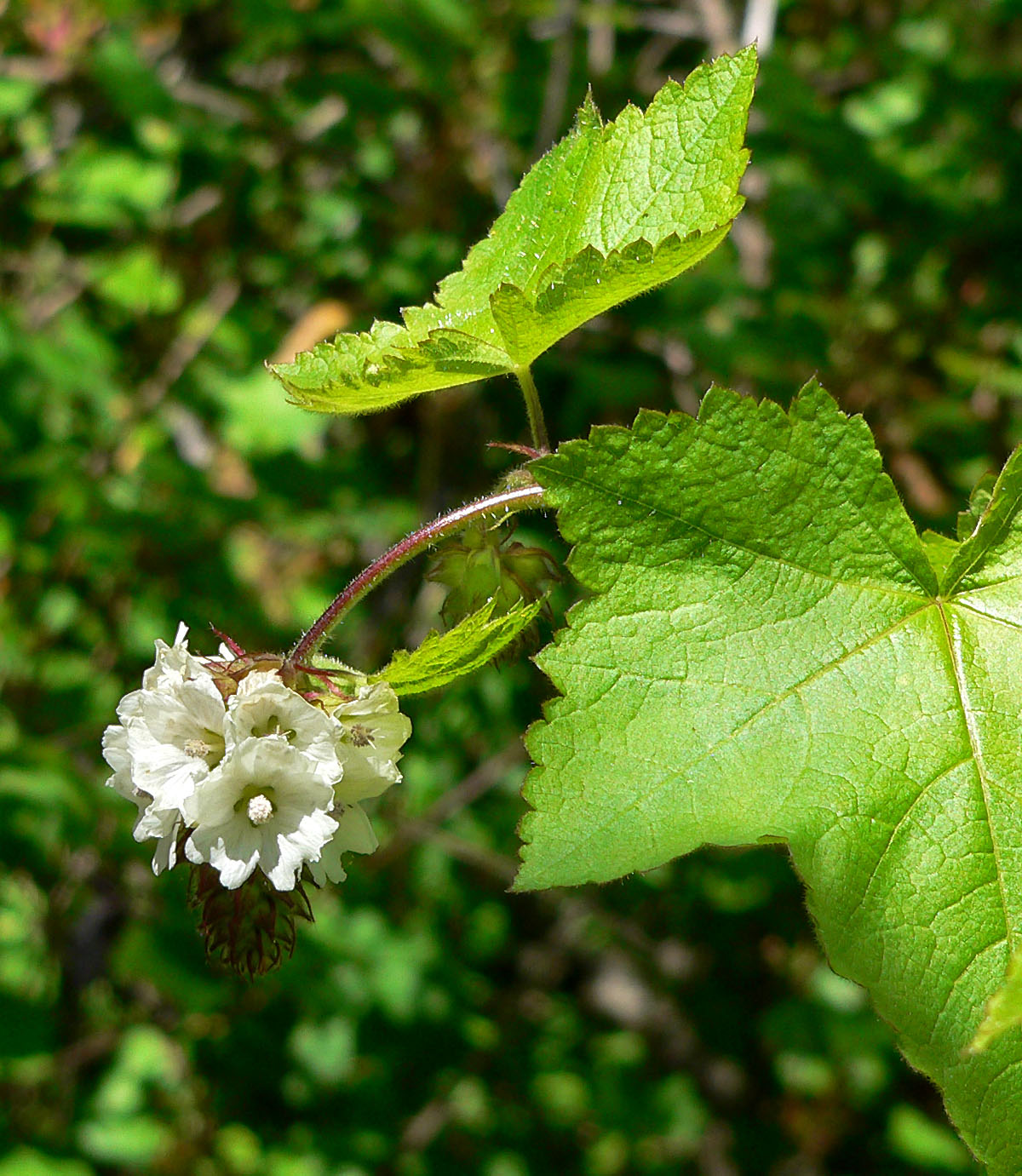

Scientific classification
- Kingdom: Plantae
- Clade: Tracheophytes
- Clade: Angiosperms
- Clade: Eudicots
- Clade: Rosids
- Order: Malvales
- Family: Malvaceae
- Genus: Sidalcea
- Species: S. malachroides

Binomial name
- Sidalcea malachroides (Hook. & Arn.) A.Gray

= Sidalcea malachroides =

Species of flowering plant

Sidalcea malachroides, with the common name mapleleaf checkerbloom, is a flowering plant in the genus Sidalcea.

== Distribution ==
The plant is native to the California Coast Ranges in the North Coast and Monterey Bay regions of California, and the Oregon Coast Range in Oregon. It grows below 700 metres (2,300 ft) in elevation.

Within California it is a Vulnerable species listed on the California Native Plant Society Inventory of Rare and Endangered Plants.

== Description ==
Sidalcea malachroides is a perennial herb or subshrub, 4–15 decimetres (16–59 in) tall. The leaves are generally all along stem.

The flowers are head-like spikes, in white or pale purple-white. The bloom period is April to August.
