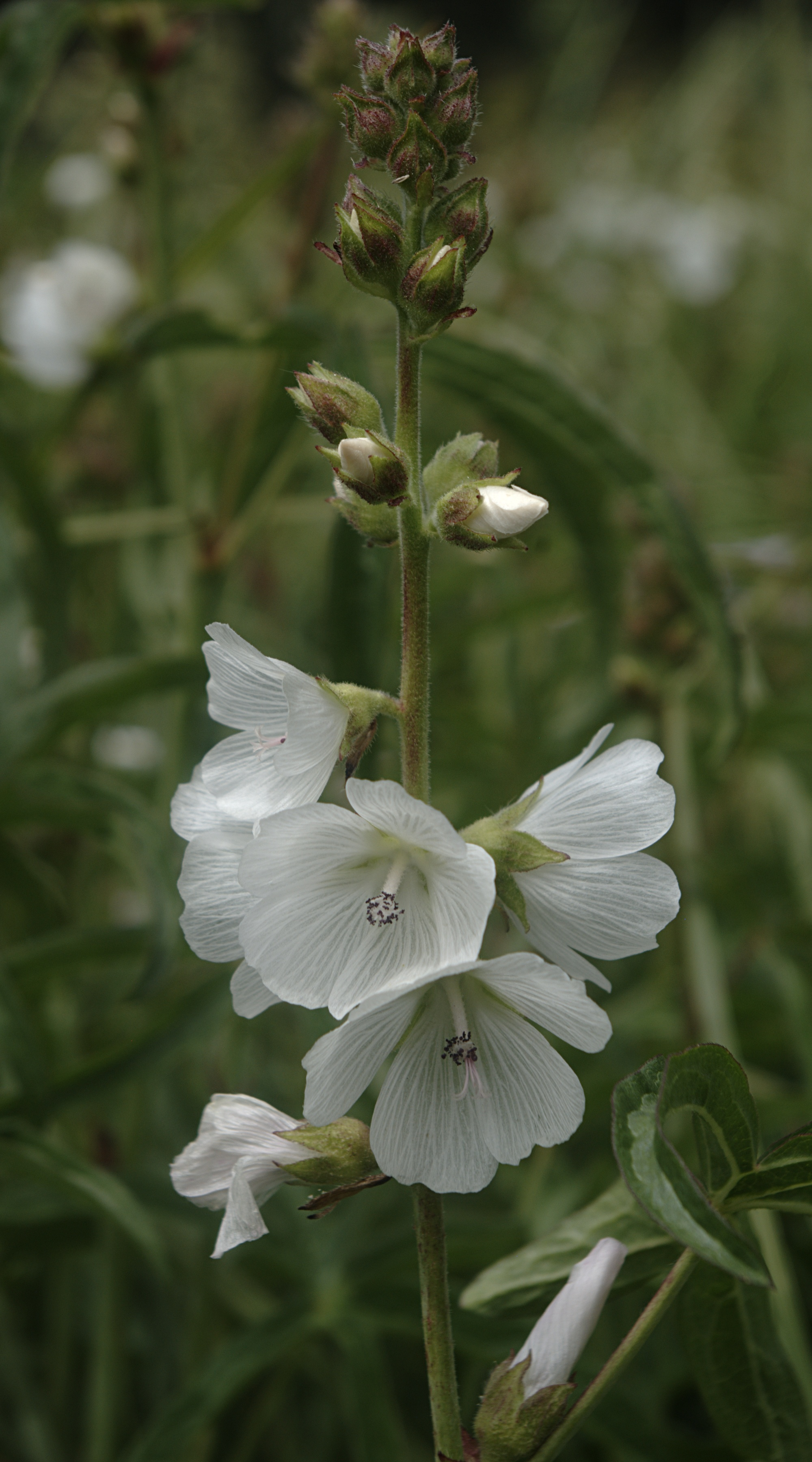

Conservation status
- Apparently Secure (NatureServe)

Scientific classification
- Kingdom: Plantae
- Clade: Tracheophytes
- Clade: Angiosperms
- Clade: Eudicots
- Clade: Rosids
- Order: Malvales
- Family: Malvaceae
- Genus: Sidalcea
- Species: S. candida

Binomial name
- Sidalcea candida A.Gray (1849)

Synonyms
- List: Sidalcea candida var. glabrata C.L.Hitchc.; Sidalcea candida var. tincta Cockerell

= Sidalcea candida =

Plant species in the mallow family

Sidalcea candida, commonly called the white checkerbloom, prairie mallow or white checkermallow, is a wildflower found from Nevada to Wyoming and south to the southern part of New Mexico. The plant grows to three feet, and is also known as wild hollyhock. Its flowers are about one inch wide with five petals. It is found mostly in mountain meadows and along streams. It flowers between June and September.

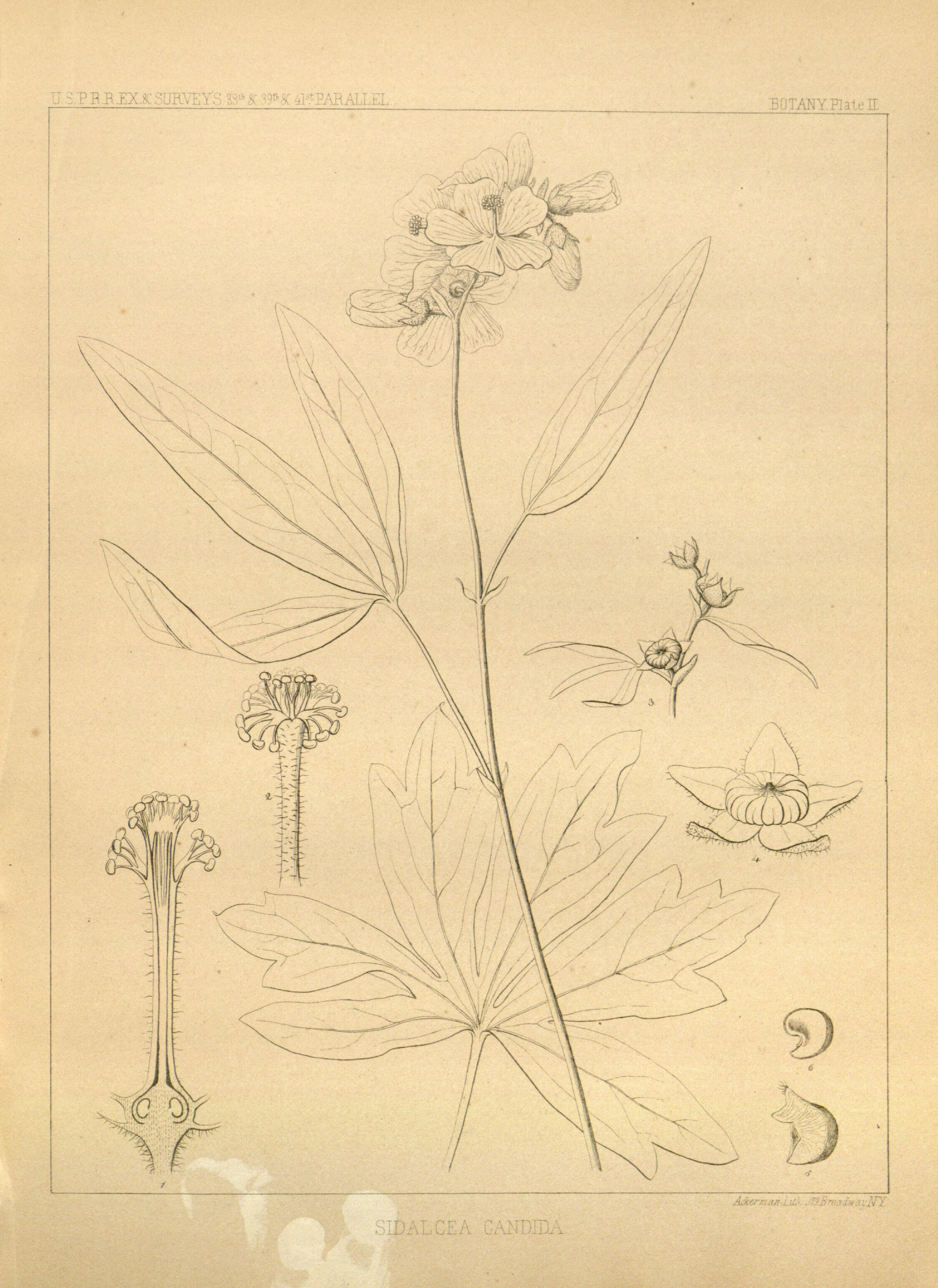
Illustration showing details of plant.
