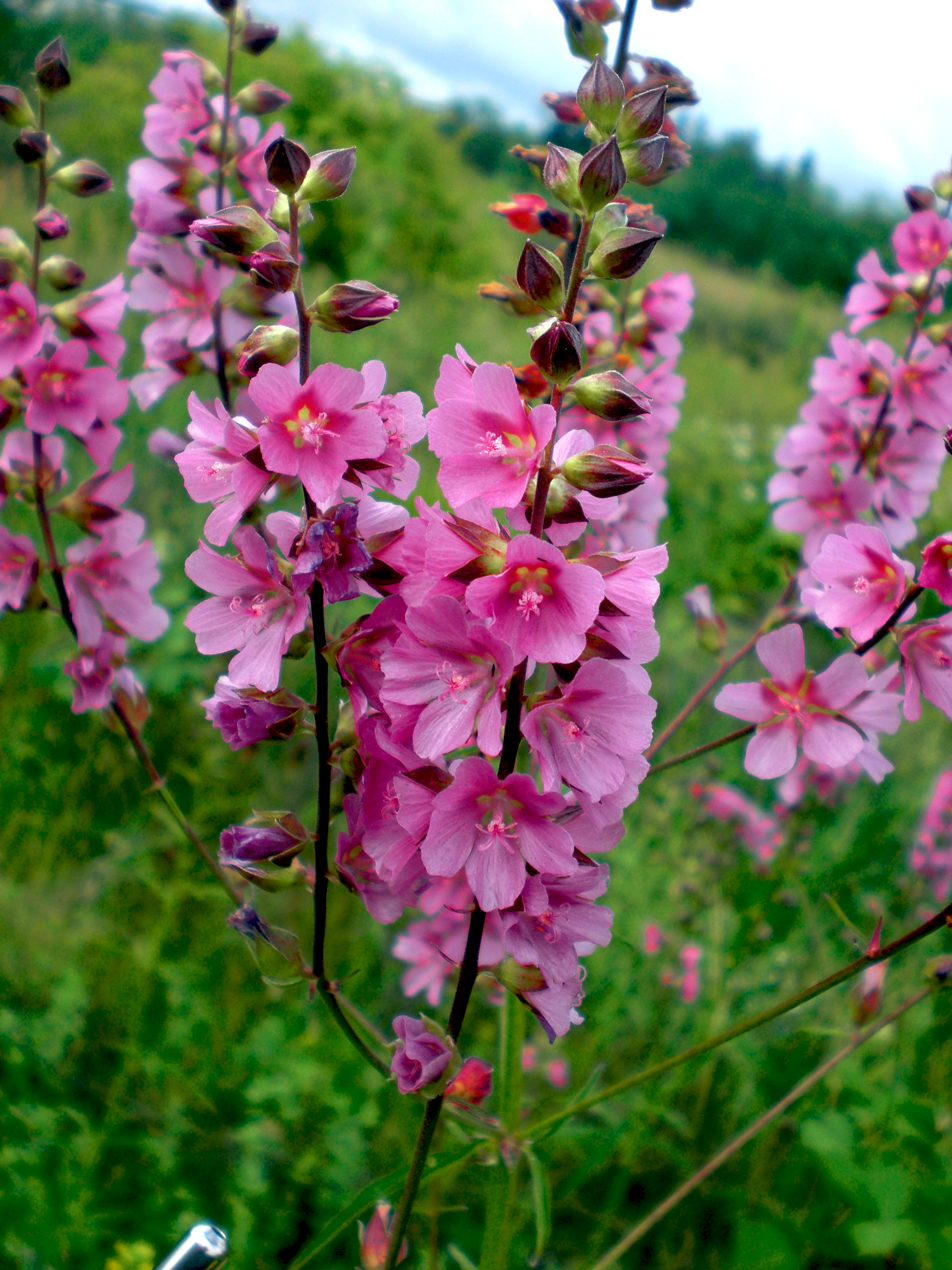

Conservation status
- Apparently Secure (NatureServe)

Scientific classification
- Kingdom: Plantae
- Clade: Tracheophytes
- Clade: Angiosperms
- Clade: Eudicots
- Clade: Rosids
- Order: Malvales
- Family: Malvaceae
- Genus: Sidalcea
- Species: S. cusickii

Binomial name
- Sidalcea cusickii Piper

= Sidalcea cusickii =

Species of flowering plant

Sidalcea cusickii, or Cusick's checkerbloom, is a species of flowering plant in the family Malvaceae. It is endemic to Oregon in the United States.

This species is a perennial herb reaching 1.8 meters in maximum height. It grows from a thick taproot and rhizomes. It produces several purple-tinged, often hollow stems lined with toothed, palmate leaves. They bear dense, spike-shaped inflorescences of many flowers.

This plant grows in moist to wet areas with fertile soils, such as mountain meadows. It may be associated with rushes and camas.
