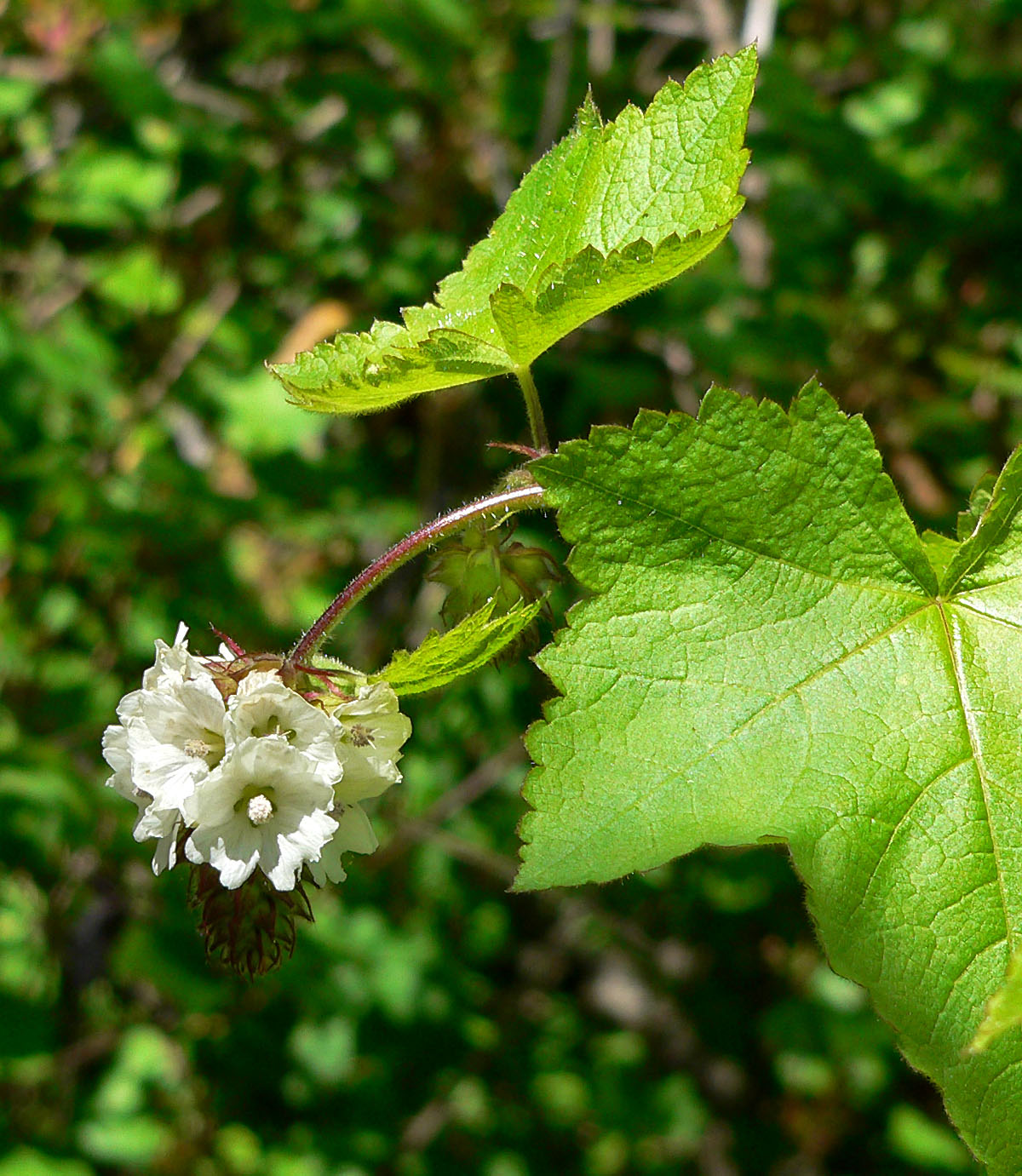
- Sidalcea malachroides

Scientific classification
- Kingdom: Plantae
- Clade: Tracheophytes
- Clade: Angiosperms
- Clade: Eudicots
- Clade: Rosids
- Order: Malvales
- Family: Malvaceae
- Subfamily: Malvoideae
- Tribe: Malveae
- Genus: Sidalcea; A. Gray ex Benth.

Species
- See text

Synonyms
- Hesperalcea Greene

= Sidalcea =

Genus of flowering plants

Sidalcea is a genus (approx. 25 species) of the botanical family Malvaceae. It contains several species of flowering plants known generally as checkerblooms or checkermallows, or prairie mallows in the United Kingdom. They can be annuals or perennials, some rhizomatous. They are native to West and Central North America.

In mid- to late summer the clumps of toothed basal leaves produce erect flowering stems, with 5-petalled mallow-type flowers in terminal racemes, in shades of pink, white and purple.

Sidalcea is generally diploid (2n = 20), but polyploidy (4n, 6n) also occurs.

Annuality appears to have evolved multiple times (4+) within this genus, although an ancestral annual state with annual paraphyly is also possible. Further, evolution rates within annual Sidalcea lineages appear to be faster than those of perennial lineages, at least when examining nuclear ribosomal DNA (internal and external transcribed spacer regions).

== Species ==
29 species are accepted. (A = annual, P = perennial)

- Sidalcea asprella Greene (P)
- Sidalcea calycosa M.E.Jones – annual checkerbloom (A)
- Sidalcea campestris Greene – meadow checkermallow (P)
- Sidalcea candida A.Gray – white checkerbloom (P)
- Sidalcea celata (Jeps.) S.R.Hill
- Sidalcea covillei Greene – Owens Valley sidalcea (P)
- Sidalcea cusickii Piper – Cusick's checkermallow (P)
- Sidalcea diploscypha (Torr. & A.Gray) A.Gray ex Benth. – fringed checkerbloom (A)
- Sidalcea gigantea G.Clifton, R.E.Buck & S.R.Hill (P)
- Sidalcea glaucescens Greene – waxy checkerbloom (P)
- Sidalcea hartwegii A.Gray ex Benth. – valley checkerbloom (A)
- Sidalcea hendersonii S.Watson – Henderson's checkermallow (P)
- Sidalcea hickmanii Greene – chaparral checkerbloom (P)
- Sidalcea hirsuta A.Gray – hairy checkerbloom (A)
- Sidalcea hirtipes C.L.Hitchc. – hairy-stemmed checker-mallow (P)
- Sidalcea keckii Wiggins – Keck's checkerbloom (A)
- Sidalcea malachroides (Hook. & Arn.) A.Gray – mapleleaf checkerbloom (P)
- Sidalcea malviflora (DC.) A.Gray – dwarf checkerbloom
- Sidalcea multifida Greene (P)
- Sidalcea nelsoniana Piper – Nelson's checkermallow (threatened)
- Sidalcea neomexicana A.Gray – Salt Spring checkerbloom (P)
- Sidalcea oregana (Nutt.) A.Gray – Oregon checkerbloom (miniature hollyhock)
  - Sidalcea oregana var. calva – Wenatchee Mountains checkermallow
- Sidalcea pedata A.Gray – birdfooted checkerbloom, Big Bear checkerbloom (P)
- Sidalcea ranunculacea Greene – marsh checkerbloom
- Sidalcea reptans Greene – Sierra checkerbloom
- Sidalcea robusta A.Heller – Butte County checkerbloom (P)
- Sidalcea setosa C.L.Hitchc.
- Sidalcea sparsifolia (C.L.Hitchc.) S.R.Hill
- Sidalcea stipularis J.T.Howell & G.H.True – Scadden Flat checkerbloom (P)

Garden cultivars are hybrids between S. candida and S. malviflora. The perennial cultivars "Elsie Heugh", 'Oberon' and "William Smith" have gained the Royal Horticultural Society's Award of Garden Merit.

== Gallery ==
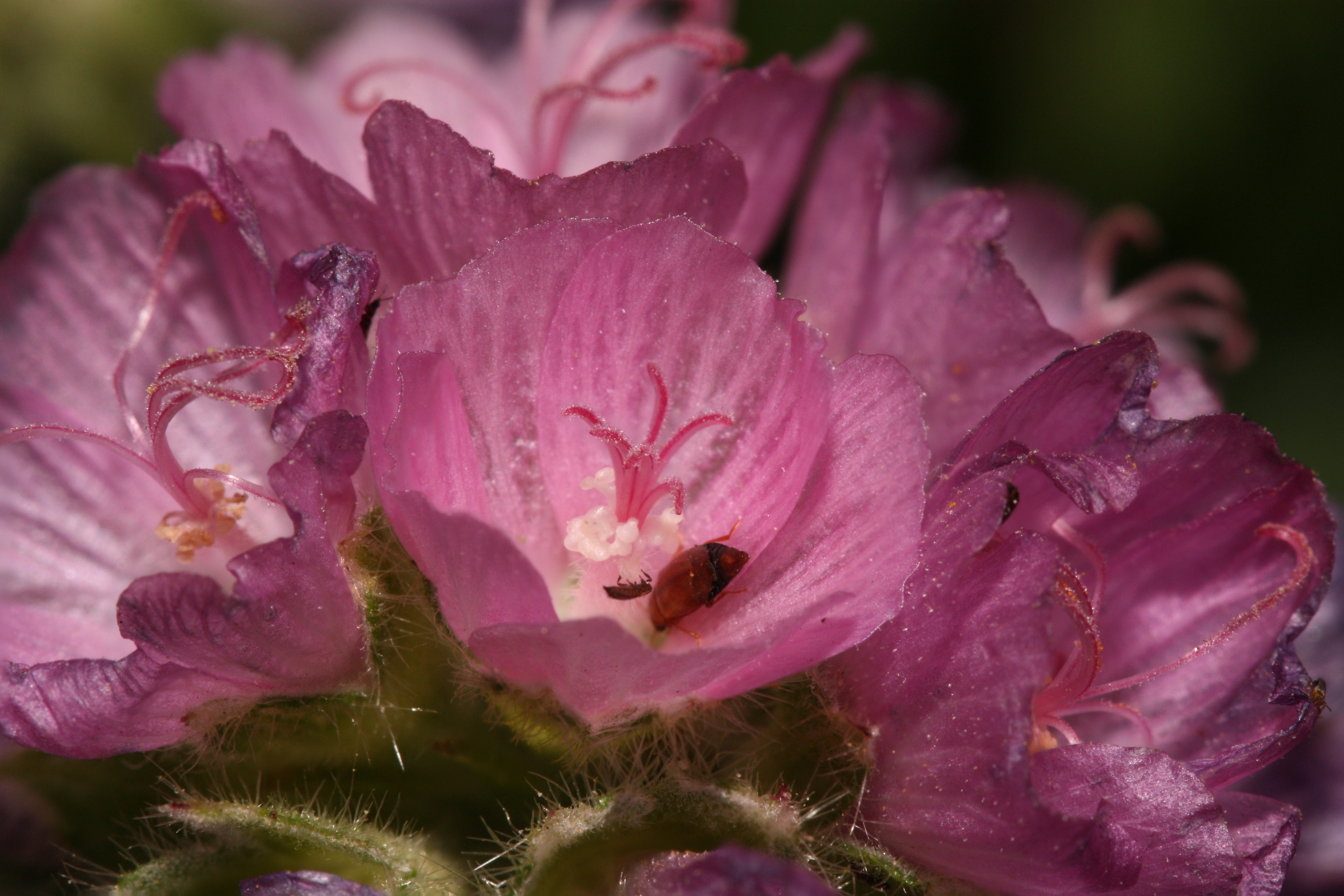
Sidalcea hirtipes

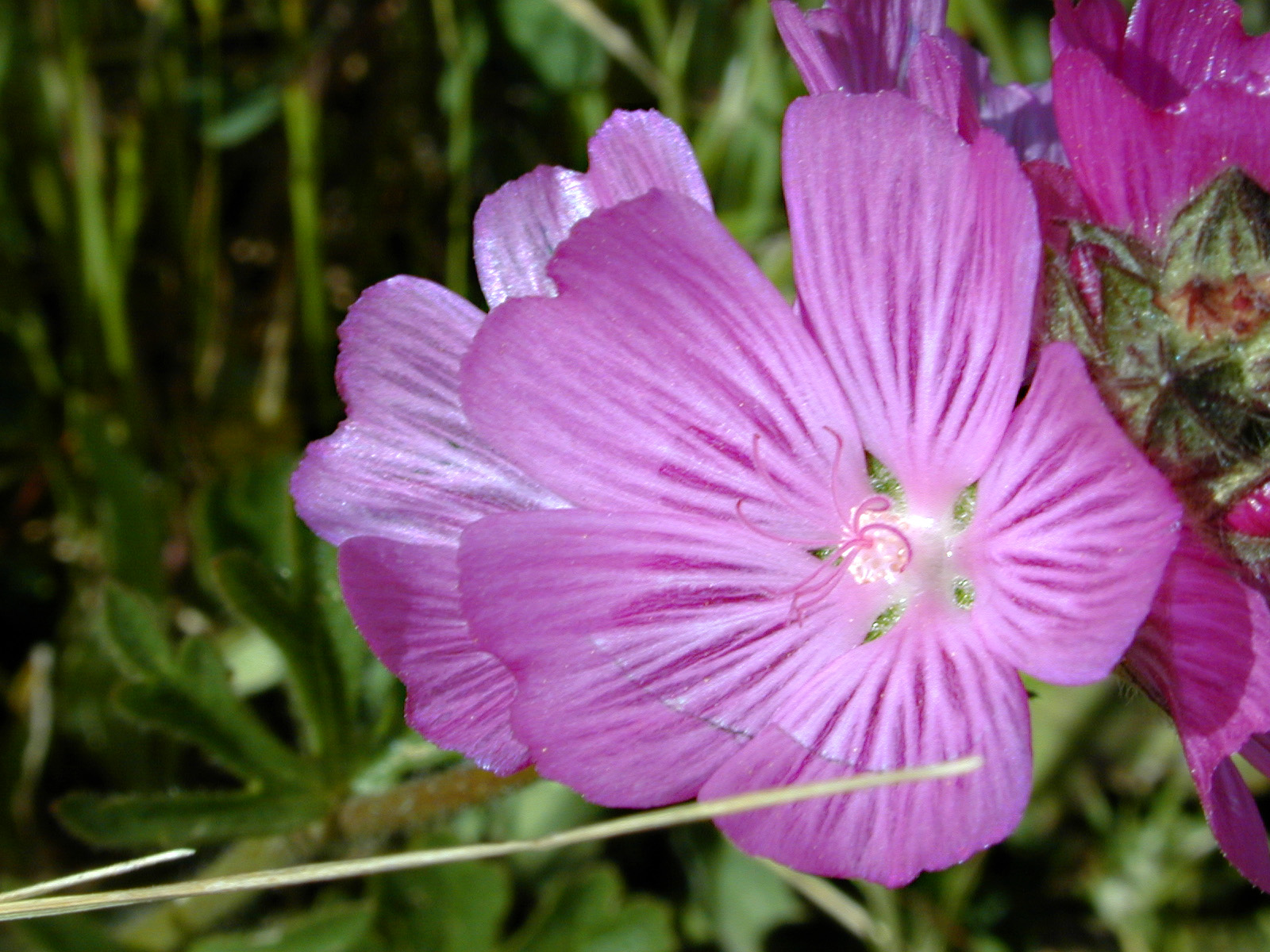
Sidalcea malviflora

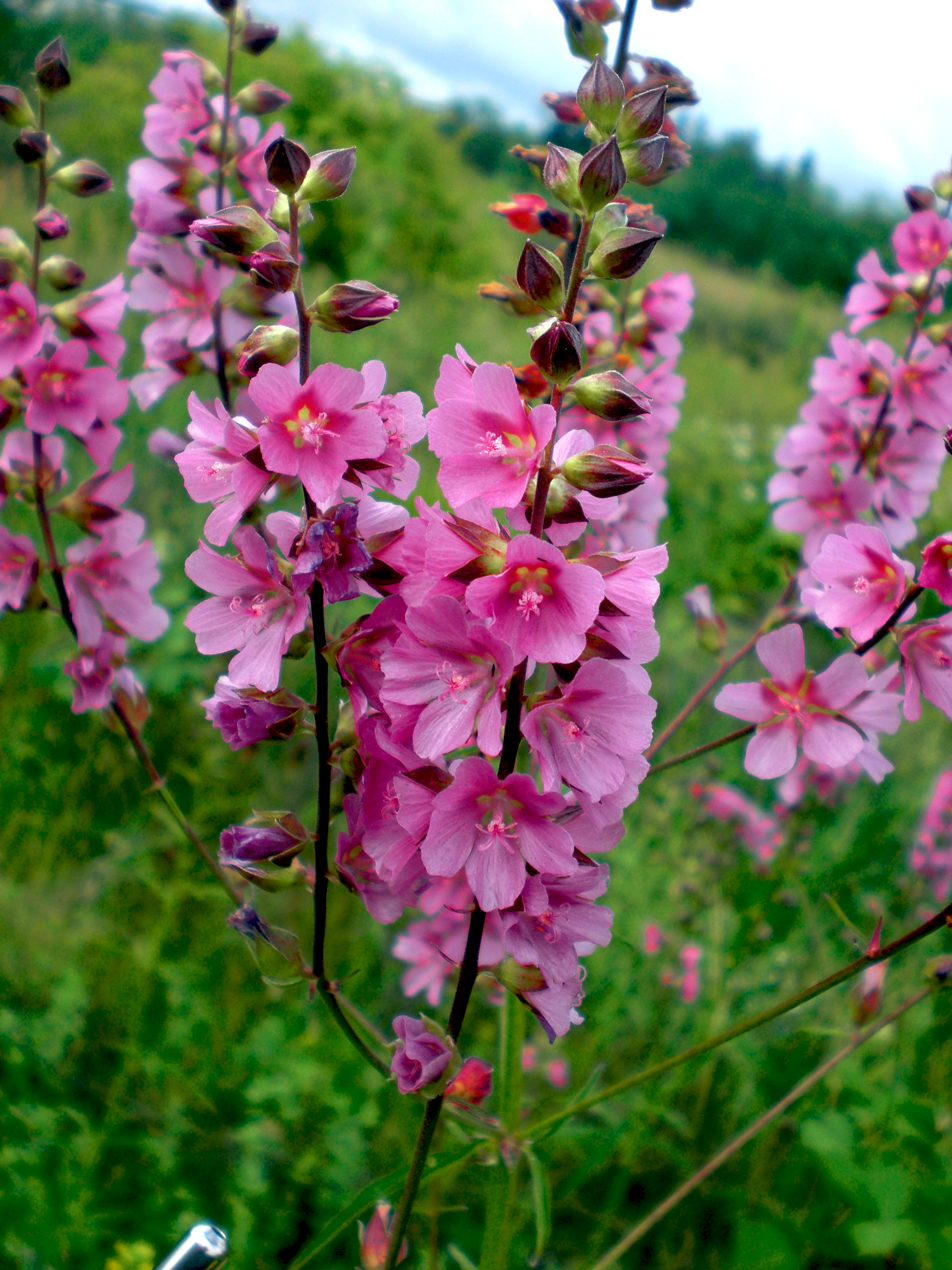
Sidalcea cusickii

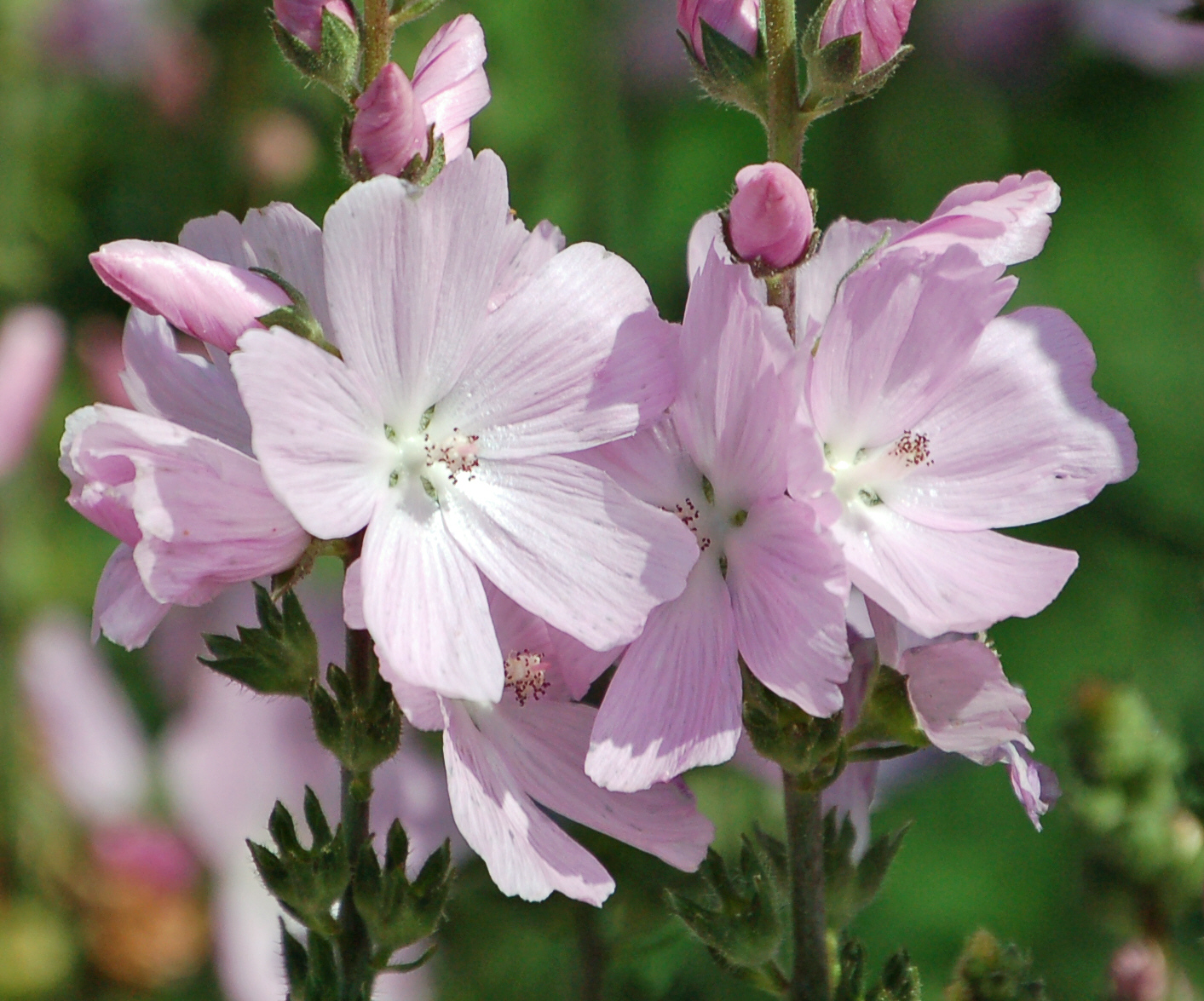
cv. ’Elsie Heugh’
