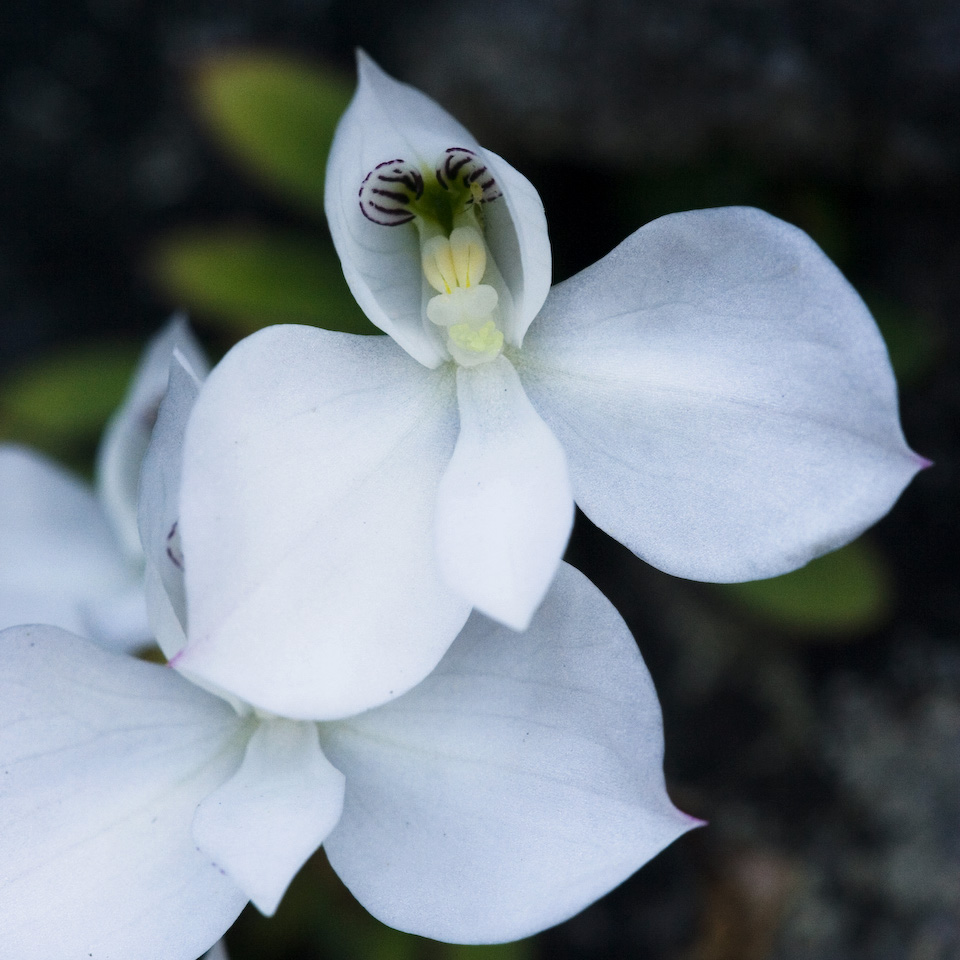

Scientific classification
- Kingdom: Plantae
- Clade: Tracheophytes
- Clade: Angiosperms
- Clade: Monocots
- Order: Asparagales
- Family: Orchidaceae
- Subfamily: Orchidoideae
- Genus: Disa
- Species: D. virginalis

Binomial name
- Disa virginalis H.P. Linder 1998

= Disa virginalis =

Species of orchid

Disa virginalis is a species of orchid found in Southwest Cape Province, South Africa.
