= Rubus permixtus =

Scientific classification
- Kingdom: Plantae
- Clade: Tracheophytes
- Clade: Angiosperms
- Clade: Eudicots
- Clade: Rosids
- Order: Rosales
- Family: Rosaceae
- Genus: Rubus
- Species: R. permixtus

Binomial name
- Rubus permixtus Blanch. 1906 not Schmidely 1911

Synonyms
- Rubus distinctus L.H.Bailey; Rubus laevior (L.H.Bailey) Fernald; Rubus permixtus var. laevior L.H.Bailey; Rubus sharpii L.H.Bailey; Rubus vegrandis L.H.Bailey

Species of fruit and plant

Rubus permixtus is a North American species of dewberry in the genus Rubus, a member of the rose family. It grows in scattered locations in the north-central and northeastern United States, from Maine south as far as West Virginia plus Michigan and Wisconsin. Nowhere is it very common.

Rubus permixtus is a nearly prostrate shrub that runs along the ground as much as 6 feet (180 cm), with vertical stems arising from those on the ground. Fruits are generally black, sweet, and edible.
