= List of Boronia species =

A molecular phylogenetic study in 2020 showed that as then circumscribed Boronia was polyphyletic, and species were moved to other genera, mainly Cyanothamnus. The split was accepted in a 2021 classification of the family Rutaceae. The following list shows the species accepted by Plants of the World Online, as of September 2021.

- Boronia adamsiana F.Muell.
- Boronia affinis R.Br. ex Benth.
- Boronia alata Sm.
- Boronia albiflora R.Br. ex Benth.
- Boronia algida F.Muell.
- Boronia alulata Sol. ex Benth.
- Boronia amabilis S.T.Blake
- Boronia amplectens Duretto
- Boronia anceps Paul G.Wilson
- Boronia angustisepala Duretto
- Boronia anomala Duretto
- Boronia barkeriana F.Muell.
- Boronia barrettiorum Duretto
- Boronia beeronensis Duretto
- Boronia bella Duretto
- Boronia boliviensis J.B.Williams & J.T.Hunter
- Boronia bowmanii F.Muell.
- Boronia capitata Benth.
- Boronia chartacea P.H.Weston
- Boronia citrata N.G.Walsh
- Boronia citriodora Gunn ex Hook.f.
- Boronia clavata Paul G.Wilson
- Boronia coriacea Paul G.Wilson
- Boronia corynophylla Paul G.Wilson
- Boronia crassifolia Bartl.
- Boronia crassipes Bartl.
- Boronia cremnophila R.L.Barrett, M.D.Barrett & Duretto
- Boronia crenulata Sm.
- Boronia cymosa Endl.
- Boronia deanei Maiden & Betche
- Boronia decumbens Duretto
- Boronia denticulata Sm.
- Boronia dichotoma Lindl.
- Boronia duiganiae Duretto
- Boronia edwardsii Benth.
- Boronia elisabethiae Duretto
- Boronia eriantha Lindl.
- Boronia ericifolia Benth.
- Boronia excelsa Duretto
- Boronia exilis Paul G.Wilson
- Boronia falcifolia A.Cunn. ex Endl.
- Boronia fastigiata Bartl.
- Boronia filicifolia A.Cunn. ex Benth.
- Boronia filifolia F.Muell.
- Boronia floribunda Sieber ex Rchb.
- Boronia foetida Duretto
- Boronia forsteri Duretto
- Boronia fraseri Hook.
- Boronia galbraithiae Albr.
- Boronia glabra (Maiden & Betche) Cheel
- Boronia gracilipes F.Muell.
- Boronia grandisepala F.Muell.
- Boronia granitica Maiden & Betche
- Boronia gravicocca Duretto
- Boronia grimshawii Duretto
- Boronia gunnii Hook.f.
- Boronia hapalophylla Duretto, F.J.Edwards & P.G.Edwards
- Boronia hartleyi Duretto & Bayly
- Boronia hemichiton Duretto
- Boronia heterophylla F.Muell.
- Boronia hippopalus Duretto, orthographic variant Boronia hippopala
- Boronia hoipolloi Duretto
- Boronia humifusa Paul G.Wilson
- Boronia imlayensis Duretto
- Boronia inornata Turcz.
- Boronia interrex R.L.Barrett, M.D.Barrett & Duretto
- Boronia jensziae Duretto
- Boronia jucunda Duretto
- Boronia juncea Bartl.
- Boronia kalumburuensis Duretto
- Boronia keysii Domin
- Boronia koniambiensis Däniker
- Boronia lanceolata F.Muell.
- Boronia lanuginosa Endl.
- Boronia latipinna J.H.Willis
- Boronia laxa Duretto
- Boronia ledifolia (Vent.) DC.
- Boronia marcoana R.L.Barrett & M.D.Barrett
- Boronia megastigma Nees ex Bartlett
- Boronia microphylla Sieber ex Rchb.
- Boronia minutipinna Duretto
- Boronia mollis A.Cunn. ex Lindl.
- Boronia molloyae J.R.Drumm.
- Boronia muelleri (Benth.) Cheel
- Boronia nematophylla F.Muell.
- Boronia obovata C.T.White
- Boronia octandra Paul G.Wilson
- Boronia odorata Duretto
- Boronia oxyantha Turcz.
- Boronia palasepala Duretto
- Boronia pancheri (Baill.) Duretto & Bayly
- Boronia parviflora Sm.
- Boronia parvifolia (Baker f.) Duretto & Bayly
- Boronia pauciflora W.Fitzg.
- Boronia pilosa Labill.
- Boronia pinnata Sm.
- Boronia prolixa Duretto
- Boronia pulchella Turcz.
- Boronia purdieana Diels
- Boronia quadrilata Duretto
- Boronia quinkanensis Duretto
- Boronia repanda (F.Muell. ex Maiden & Betche) Maiden & Betche
- Boronia revoluta Paul G.Wilson
- Boronia rhomboidea Hook.
- Boronia rivularis C.T.White
- Boronia rosmarinifolia A.Cunn. ex Endl.
- Boronia rozefeldsii Duretto
- Boronia rubiginosa A.Cunn. ex Endl.
- Boronia rupicola Duretto
- Boronia ruppii Cheel
- Boronia safrolifera Cheel
- Boronia scabra Lindl.
- Boronia serrulata Sm.
- Boronia spathulata Lindl.
- Boronia splendida Duretto
- Boronia squamipetala Duretto
- Boronia stricta Bartl.
- Boronia suberosa Duretto
- Boronia subulifolia Cheel
- Boronia ternata Endl.
- Boronia tetragona Paul G.Wilson
- Boronia tetrandra Labill.
- Boronia thedae R.L.Barrett, M.D.Barrett & Duretto
- Boronia thujona Penfold & M.B.Welch
- Boronia tolerans Duretto
- Boronia umbellata P.H.Weston
- Boronia verecunda Duretto
- Boronia virgata Paul G.Wilson
- Boronia viridiflora Duretto
- Boronia warrumbunglensis P.H.Weston
- Boronia whitei Cheel
- Boronia wilsonii (F.Muell. ex Benth.) Duretto
- Boronia xanthastrum Duretto
- Boronia zeteticorum Duretto

Unplaced names:

- Boronia ovata Lindl.
- Boronia tenuior Domin

== Former species ==
Species no longer placed in Boronia include:

- Cyanothamnus acanthocladus (Paul G.Wilson) Duretto & Heslewood (formerly Boronia acanthoclada)
- Cyanothamnus anemonifolius (A.Cunn.) Duretto & Heslewood – sticky boronia (formerly Boronia anemonifolia)
- Cyanothamnus baeckeaceus (F.Muell.) Duretto & Heslewood (formerly Boronia baeckeacea)
- Cyanothamnus bipinnatus (Lindl.) Duretto & Heslewood – rock boronia (formerly Boronia bipinnata)
- Cyanothamnus bussellianus (F.Muell.) Duretto & Heslewood (formerly Boronia busselliana)
- Cyanothamnus coerulescens (F.Muell.) Duretto & Heslewood – blue boronia (formerly Boronia coerulescens)
- Cyanothamnus defoliatus (F.Muell.) Duretto & Heslewood (formerly Boronia defoliata)
- Cyanothamnus fabianoides (Diels) Duretto & Heslewood (formerly Boronia fabianoides)
- Cyanothamnus inconspicuus (Benth.) Duretto & Heslewood (formerly Boronia inconspicua)
- Cyanothamnus inflexus (Duretto) Duretto & Heslewood (formerly Boronia inflexa)
- Cyanothamnus montimulliganensis (Duretto) Duretto & Heslewood (formerly Boronia montimulliganensis)
- Cyanothamnus nanus (Hook.) Duretto & Heslewood – small boronia (formerly Boronia nana)
- Cyanothamnus occidentalis (Duretto) Duretto & Heslewood (formerly Boronia occidentalis)
- Cyanothamnus penicillatus (Benth.) Duretto & Heslewood (formerly Boronia penicillata)
- Cyanothamnus polygalifolius (Sm.) Duretto & Heslewood – waxy boronia, dwarf boronia, milkwort boronia(formerly Boronia polygalifolia)
- Cyanothamnus quadrangulus Duretto & Heslewood – narrow-leaved boronia (formerly Boronia anethifolia)
- Cyanothamnus ramosus Lindl. (formerly Boronia ramosa)
- Cyanothamnus rigens (Cheel) Duretto & Heslewood – stiff boronia (formerly Boronia rigens)
- Cyanothamnus subsessilis Benth. Duretto & Heslewood (formerly Boronia subsessilis)
- Cyanothamnus tenuis Lindl. – blue boronia (formerly Boronia tenuis)
- Cyanothamnus warangensis (Duretto) Duretto & Heslewood (formerly Boronia warangensis)
- Cyanothamnus westringioides (Paul G.Wilson) Duretto & Heslewood (formerly Boronia westringioides)
- Cyanothamnus yarrowmerensis (Duretto) Duretto & Heslewood (formerly Boronia yarrowmerensis)
