= Boronia koniambiensis =

Conservation status
- Vulnerable (IUCN 3.1)

Scientific classification
- Kingdom: Plantae
- Clade: Tracheophytes
- Clade: Angiosperms
- Clade: Eudicots
- Clade: Rosids
- Order: Sapindales
- Family: Rutaceae
- Genus: Boronia
- Species: B. koniambiensis

Binomial name
- Boronia koniambiensis Däniker

Synonyms
- Boronella koniambiensis (Däniker) T.G.Hartley

Species of flowering plant

Boronia koniambiensis is a species of plant in the citrus family Rutaceae and is endemic to New Caledonia. It was first formally described in 1932 by Albert Ulrich Däniker then transferred to the genus Boronella in 1995 by Thomas Gordon Hartley as Boronella koniambiensis. In 2015, all the species in Boronella were transferred to Boronia on the basis of molecular phylogenetic analysis.

This boronia occurs on the Koniambo Massif on the island of Grande Terre, the main island of New Caledonia. It is listed as "Vulnerable" (as Boronella koniamboensis) on the IUCN Red List.
