= Boronia crassipes =

Conservation status
- Priority Three — Poorly Known Taxa (DEC)

Scientific classification
- Kingdom: Plantae
- Clade: Tracheophytes
- Clade: Angiosperms
- Clade: Eudicots
- Clade: Rosids
- Order: Sapindales
- Family: Rutaceae
- Genus: Boronia
- Species: B. crassipes

Binomial name
- Boronia crassipes Bartl.
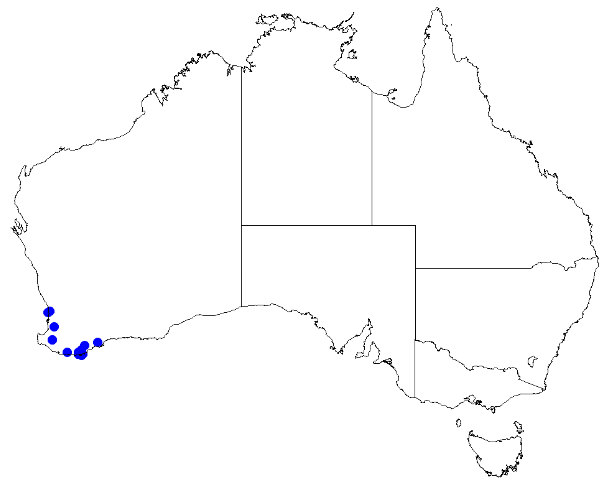
- Occurrence data from Australasian Virtual Herbarium

Species of flowering plant

Boronia crassipes is a plant in the citrus family, Rutaceae and is endemic to the south-west of Western Australia. It is an erect, spindly, glabrous shrub with simple leaves, and pale red or pale mauve, four petalled flowers.

== Description ==
Boronia crassipes is an erect, spindly shrub that grows to a height of about 0.5–3 m (2–10 ft). It has simple, linear to narrow elliptic leaves 10–15 mm (0.4–0.6 in) long. The flowers are arranged singly in leaf axils on a club-shaped pedicel about 6 mm (0.2 in) long. The four sepals are red, narrow triangular and 2–3 mm (0.08–0.1 in) long. The four petals are pale red or pale mauve, elliptic and about 7 mm (0.3 in) long. The eight stamens are about 2.5 mm (0.1 in) long a have a few soft hairs.

== Taxonomy and naming ==
Boronia crassipes was first formally described in 1845 by Friedrich Gottlieb Bartling and the description was published in Plantae Preissianae. The specific epithet (crassipes) is derived from the Latin words crassus meaning "thick", "fat" or "stout" and pes meaning "a foot".

== Distribution and habitat ==
This boronia grows peaty heath, in winter-wet sawamps and along creeklines near Albany in the Jarrah Forest and Warren biogeographic regions.

== Conservation ==
Boronia crasspies is classified as "Priority Three" by the Government of Western Australia Department of Parks and Wildlife meaning that it is poorly known and known from only a few locations but is not under imminent threat.
