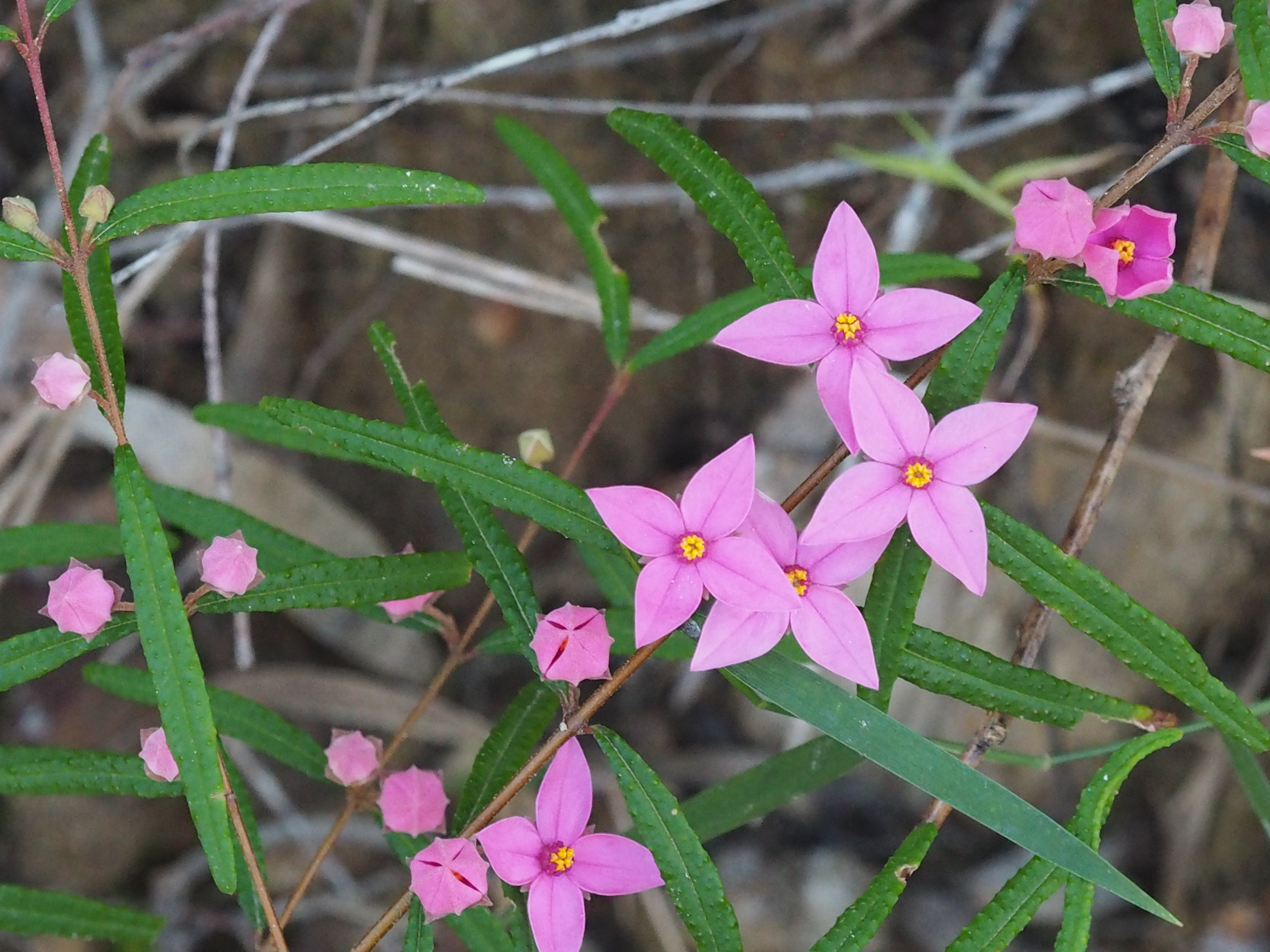
- Boronia chartacacea in Fortis Creek National Park

Scientific classification
- Kingdom: Plantae
- Clade: Tracheophytes
- Clade: Angiosperms
- Clade: Eudicots
- Clade: Rosids
- Order: Sapindales
- Family: Rutaceae
- Genus: Boronia
- Species: B. chartacea

Binomial name
- Boronia chartacea P.H.Weston
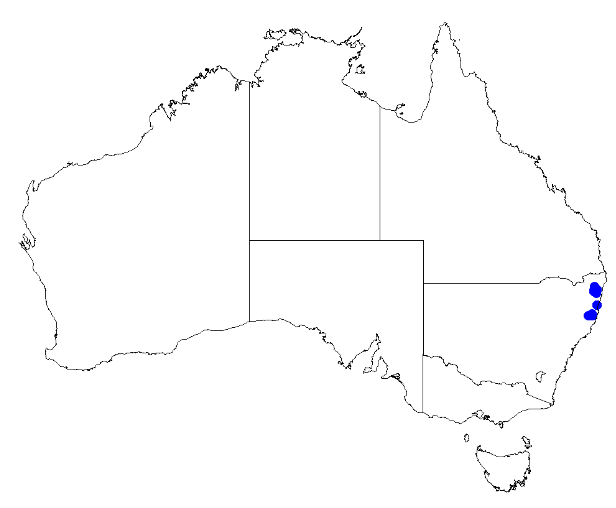
- Occurrence data from Australasian Virtual Herbarium

= Boronia chartacea =

Species of flowering plant

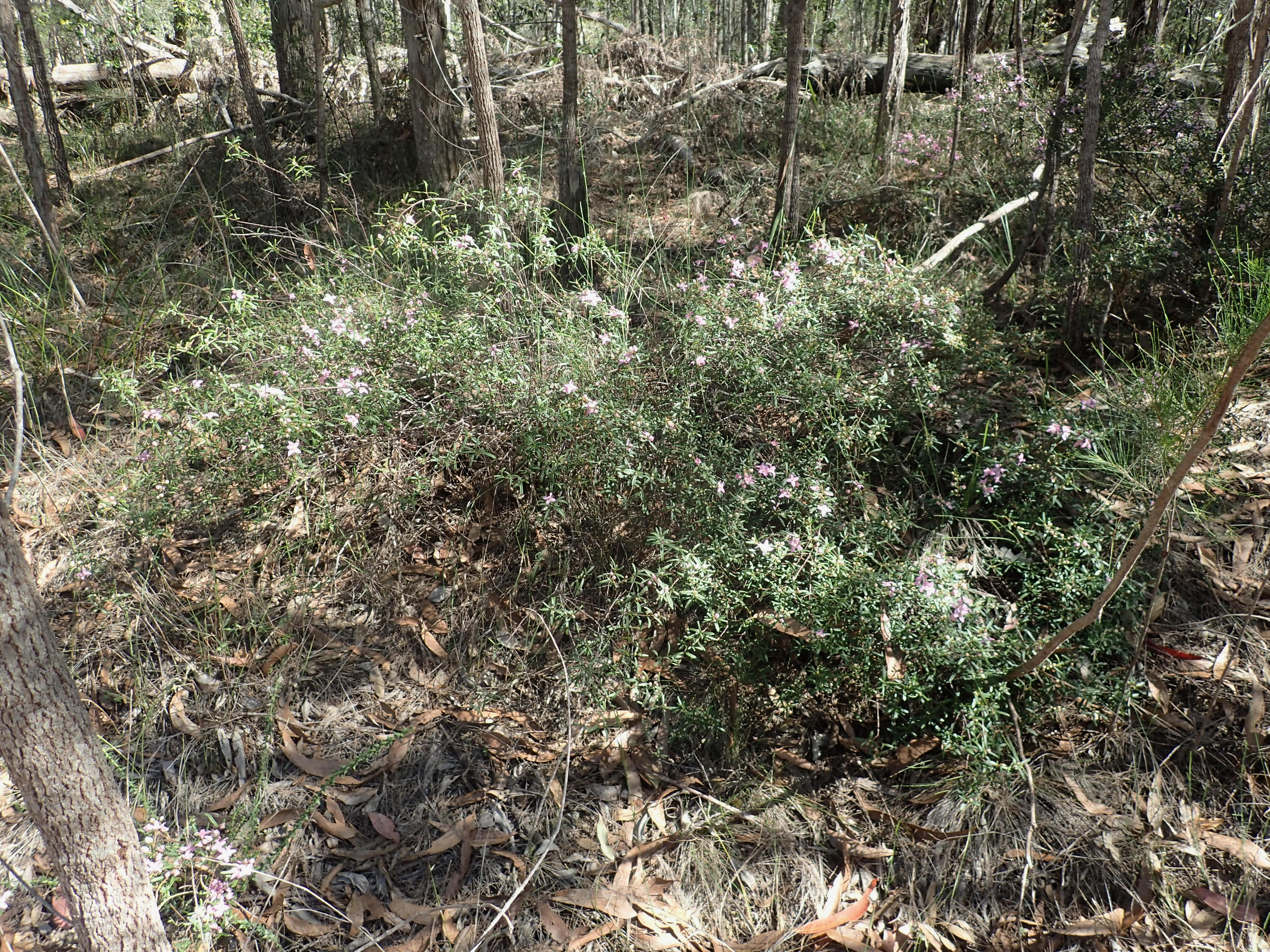
Habit

Boronia chartacea is a plant in the citrus family Rutaceae and is endemic to the north coast of New South Wales. It is a shrub with simple, papery leaves and bright pink flowers, usually arranged singly in the leaf axils.

== Description ==
Boronia chartacea is a shrub that grows to a height of 0.4–2.7 m (1–9 ft) with young branches that are hairy. The leaves are papery, elliptic to oblong, 20–50 mm (0.8–2 in) long and 2–4 mm (0.08–0.2 in) wide on a petiole 1–2 mm (0.04–0.08 in) long. The leaves are covered with warty glands and the edges are turned downwards or rolled under. The flowers are bright pink and are arranged singly or in groups of up to three in leaf axils, each flower on a stalk 1–8 mm (0.04–0.3 in) long. The four sepals are egg-shaped, 2–3.5 mm (0.079–0.14 in) long, 1.5–2.5 mm (0.059–0.098 in) wide and hairy on the lower side. The four petals are 7–9 mm (0.28–0.35 in) long. Flowering occurs from August to October and the fruit is a smooth capsule.

== Taxonomy and naming ==
Boronia chartacea was first formally described in 1990 by Peter H. Weston and the description was published in Telopea from a specimen collected near Urunga. The specific epithet (chartacea) is a Latin word meaning "of paper", referring to the leaves that are papery and brittle when dried.

== Distribution and habitat ==
This boronia grows in damp gullies and near creeks in disjunct populations near Wauchope, Urunga and Grafton.
