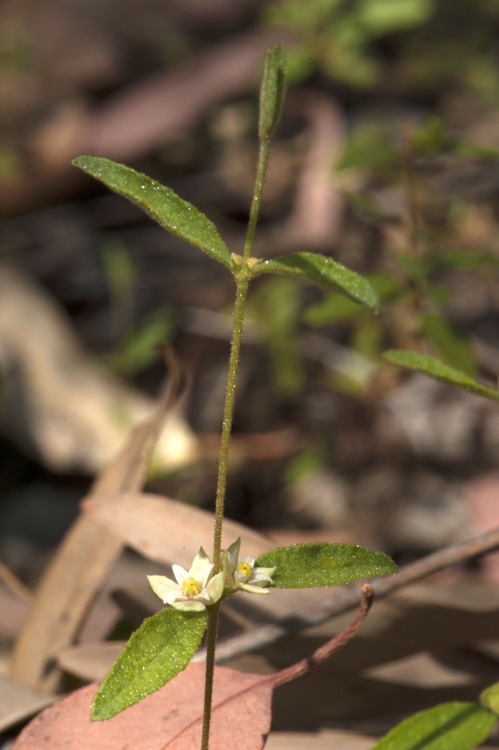
- B. laxa in Kakadu National Park

Scientific classification
- Kingdom: Plantae
- Clade: Tracheophytes
- Clade: Angiosperms
- Clade: Eudicots
- Clade: Rosids
- Order: Sapindales
- Family: Rutaceae
- Genus: Boronia
- Species: B. laxa

Binomial name
- Boronia laxa Duretto

= Boronia laxa =

Species of flowering plant

Boronia laxa is a plant in the citrus family Rutaceae and is endemic to a small area in the Northern Territory, Australia. It is a low-lying, short-lived shrub with hairy branches, leaves and flower parts, simple leaves and white to mauve flowers with the sepals longer and wider than the petals.

== Description ==
Boronia laxa is a semi-prostrate, short-lived shrub that typically grows to about 50 cm (20 in) high and 1.5 m (5 ft) wide with many branches. Its branches, leaves and some flower parts are covered with star-like hairs. The leaves are arranged in opposite pairs, simple, elliptic, 10–45 mm (0.39–1.8 in) long and 2.5–10 mm (0.1–0.4 in) wide on a petiole 0.5–3 mm (0.02–0.1 in) long. The flowers are white to pink or mauve on a pedicel 0.5–2.5 mm (0.02–0.1 in) long. The sepals are lance-shaped to egg-shaped, 4–6 mm (0.16–0.24 in) long and 2–3 mm (0.08–0.1 in) wide and the petals are 2.5–4.5 mm (0.098–0.18 in) long and 1–2 mm (0.04–0.08 in) wide. The sepals and petals enlarge as the fruit develops. Flowering occurs mainly from January to June.

== Taxonomy and naming ==
Boronia laxa was first formally described in 1997 by Marco F. Duretto who published the description in Australian Systematic Botany. The specific epithet (laxa) is a Latin word meaning "loose", "slack" or "unstrung".

== Distribution and habitat ==
Boronia laxa grows in sandstone heath and woodland on Mount Brockman in Kakadu National Park and on the nearby Arnhem Plateau.
