= Boronia zeteticorum =

Scientific classification
- Kingdom: Plantae
- Clade: Tracheophytes
- Clade: Angiosperms
- Clade: Eudicots
- Clade: Rosids
- Order: Sapindales
- Family: Rutaceae
- Genus: Boronia
- Species: B. zeteticorum

Binomial name
- Boronia zeteticorum Duretto

Species of flowering plant

Boronia zeteticorum is a species of small, semi-prostrate shrub that is endemic to a restricted part of the Northern Territory. It has hairy branches, leaves and flower parts, simple leaves and white flowers with the sepals longer and wider than the petals.

== Description ==
Boronia zeteticorum is a semi-prostrate shrub with many branches and that typically grows to about 50 cm (20 in) long. Its branches, leaves and some flower parts are covered with sessile, star-like hairs. The leaves are simple, elliptic, 10–35 mm (0.39–1.38 in) long and 1.5–3.5 mm (0.059–0.138 in) wide on a petiole about 1 mm (0.04 in) long. The flowers are arranged singly in leaf axils on a hairy pedicel about 1.5 mm (0.059 in) long with prophylls about 2 mm (0.079 in) long. The sepals are white, hairy, egg-shaped to triangular, 3.5–4 mm (0.14–0.16 in) long, about 2 mm (0.079 in) wide and longer and wider than the petals. The petals are white, 3–3.5 mm (0.12–0.14 in) long and 1–1.5 mm (0.039–0.059 in) wide. The sepals and petals enlarge as the fruit develops. Flowering has been observed in March and the fruit is a hairy capsule about 4 mm (0.16 in) long and 2 mm (0.079 in) wide.

== Taxonomy and naming ==
Boronia zeteticorum was first formally described in 2008 by Marco F. Duretto who published the description in the journal The Beagle: occasional papers of the Northern Territory Museum of Arts and Sciences. The specific epithet (zeteticorum) is derived from the ancient Greek word ζητητῐκός zetetikos meaning 'disposed to search'.

== Distribution and habitat ==
This boronia is only known from the type specimens that were collected "in sandstone country" in the Nabarlek area.
