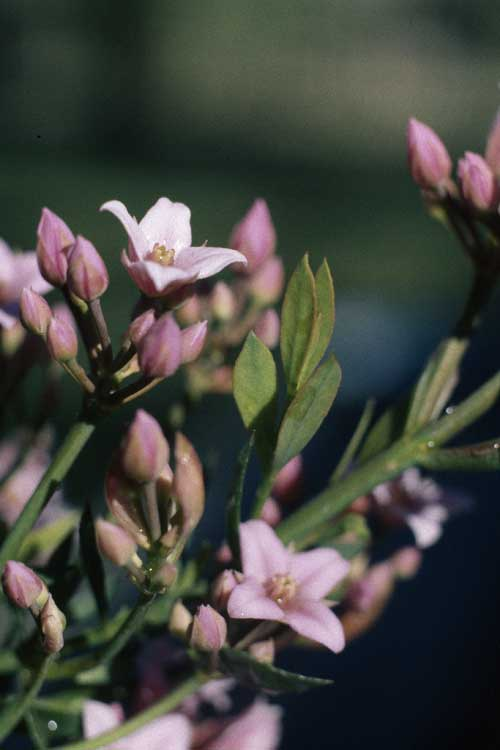

Scientific classification
- Kingdom: Plantae
- Clade: Tracheophytes
- Clade: Angiosperms
- Clade: Eudicots
- Clade: Rosids
- Order: Sapindales
- Family: Rutaceae
- Genus: Boronia
- Species: B. spathulata

Binomial name
- Boronia spathulata Lindl.
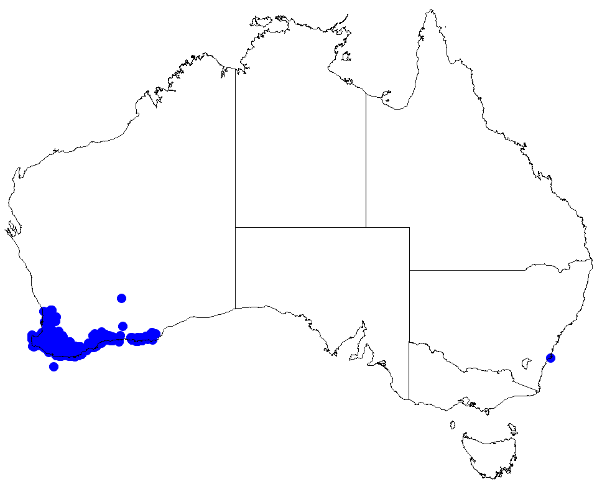
- Occurrence data from Australasian Virtual Herbarium

= Boronia spathulata =

Species of flowering plant

Boronia spathulata is a plant in the citrus family, Rutaceae and is endemic to the south-west of Western Australia. It is a glabrous shrub with well-spaced, simple, egg-shaped to elliptic leaves, and pink, four-petalled flowers.

== Description ==
Boronia spathulata is a glabrous shrub that grows to a height of about 1 m (3 ft 3 in) and has well-spaced, narrow elliptic to broadly egg-shaped leaves that are 10–20 mm (0.39–0.79 in) long. Leaves near the ends of the branchlets are usually more or less cylindrical. The flowers are arranged in cymes that have a short peduncle, the individual flowers on a red pedicel that has small bracts at its base. The side flowers have a pedicel 3–4 mm (0.12–0.16 in) long. There are four triangular to egg-shaped sepals 2.5–4 mm (0.1–0.2 in) long and four pink, egg-shaped petals 6–9 mm (0.2–0.4 in) long. The eight stamens are hairy with a small white tip on the anther and the stigma is only slightly larger than the style. Flowers are present in most months.

== Taxonomy and naming ==
Boronia spathulata was first formally described in 1839 by John Lindley and the description was published in A Sketch of the Vegetation of the Swan River Colony. The specific epithet (spathulata) is derived from the Latin word spathe meaning "any broad blade, paddle for stirring and mixing".

== Distribution and habitat ==
This boronia grows in sand near swamps or rivers and in jarrah forest. It occurs between Perth and Augusta and east to Israelite Bay.

== Conservation ==
Boronia spathulata is classified as "not threatened" by the Western Australian Government Department of Parks and Wildlife.
