= Boronia prolixa =

Scientific classification
- Kingdom: Plantae
- Clade: Tracheophytes
- Clade: Angiosperms
- Clade: Eudicots
- Clade: Rosids
- Order: Sapindales
- Family: Rutaceae
- Genus: Boronia
- Species: B. prolixa

Binomial name
- Boronia prolixa Duretto
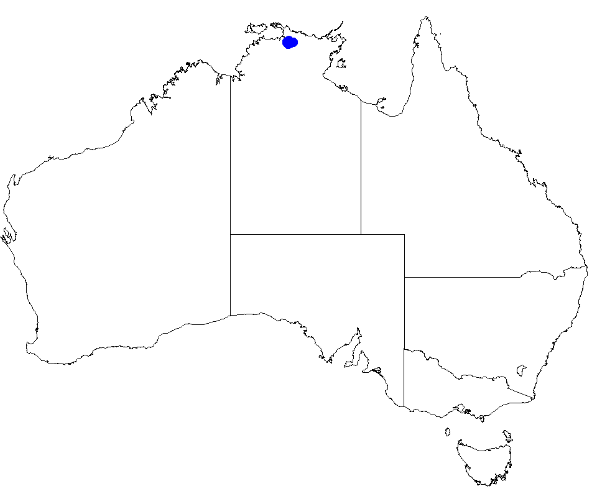
- Occurrence data from Australasian Virtual Herbarium

Species of flowering plant

Boronia prolixa is a species of plant in the citrus family Rutaceae and is endemic to a small area in the Northern Territory, Australia. It is a low-lying shrub with hairy branches, leaves and flower parts, simple leaves and white to pink flowers with the sepals longer and wider than the petals.

== Description ==
Boronia prolixa is a low-lying shrub that typically has branches to about 50 cm (20 in) long. Its branches, leaves and some flower parts are covered with star-like hairs. The leaves are lance-shaped to egg-shaped, 4.5–32 mm (0.18–1.3 in) long, 2.5–16 mm (0.1–0.6 in) wide and sessile or on a petiole up to 2 mm (0.08 in) long. The flowers have a pedicel 6–21 mm (0.2–0.8 in) long. The sepals are white to pink, egg-shaped to triangular, 4–6 mm (0.16–0.24 in) long and 1.5–3 mm (0.06–0.1 in) wide. The petals are 3–3.5 mm (0.12–0.14 in) long and 1–1.5 mm (0.04–0.06 in) wide. The sepals and petals enlarge as the fruit develops. Flowering occurs mainly from February to June.

== Taxonomy and naming ==
Boronia prolixa was first formally described in 1997 by Marco F. Duretto who published the description in Australian Systematic Botany. The specific epithet (prolixa) is a Latin word meaning "stretched out" or "long".

== Distribution and habitat ==
Boronia prolixa grows in sandstone heath and woodland on the north-western Arnhem Plateau.
