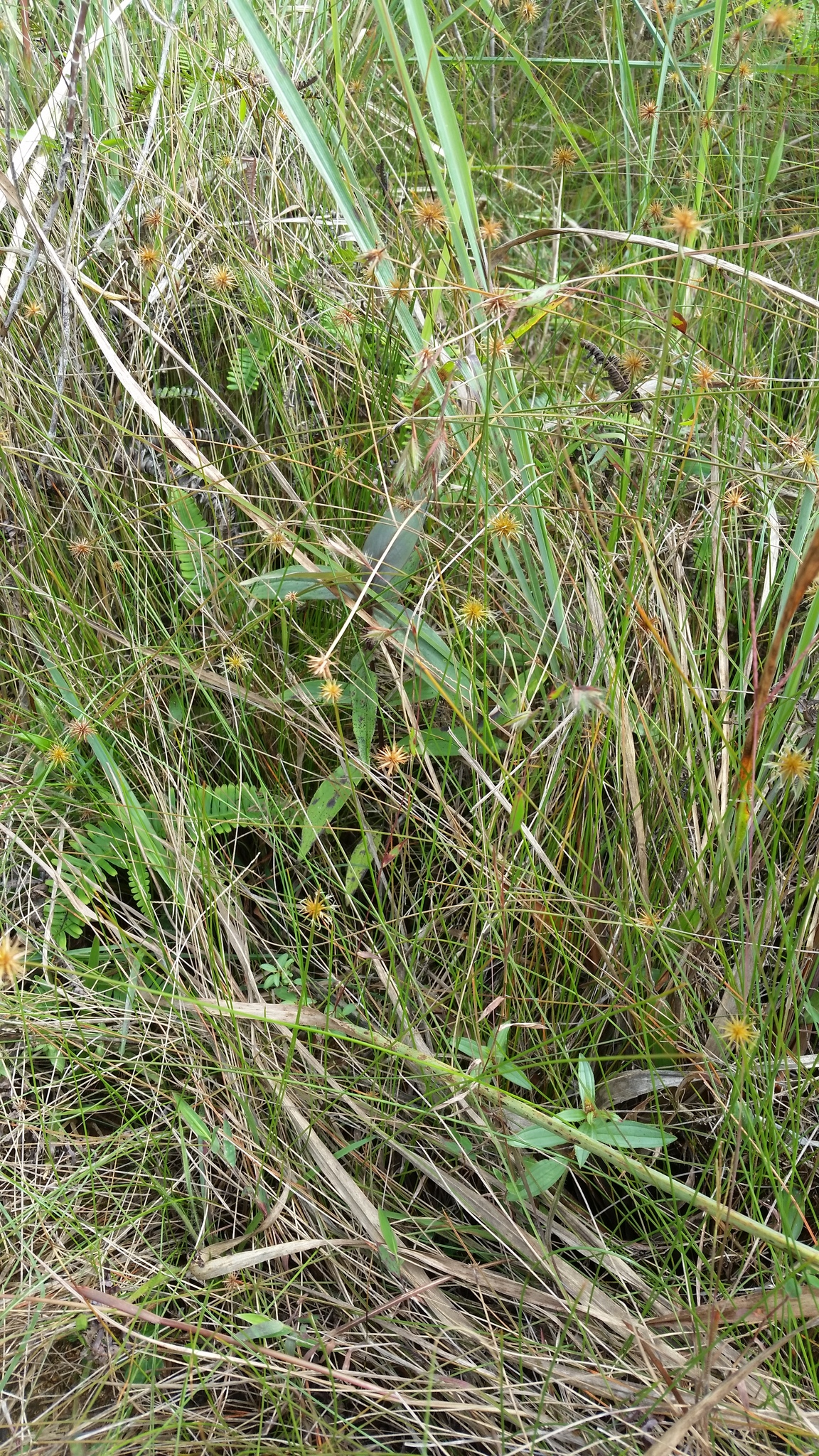
- Actinoschoenus aphyllus

Scientific classification
- Kingdom: Plantae
- Clade: Tracheophytes
- Clade: Angiosperms
- Clade: Monocots
- Clade: Commelinids
- Order: Poales
- Family: Cyperaceae
- Tribe: Abildgaardieae
- Genus: Actinoschoenus; Benth.

Species
- See text

= Actinoschoenus =

Genus of grass-like plants

Actinoschoenus is a genus of the sedge family. It contains three species native to central tropical Africa, Madagascar, tropical Asia, and Australia.

== Species ==
According to a 2021 taxonomic revision based on molecular data, the genus includes two species, Actinoschoenus aphyllus and A. repens. Reference databases Plants of the World Online and World Flora Online also include A. yunnanensis.

- Actinoschoenus aphyllus (Vahl) Larridon – west-central tropical Africa, Madagascar and Mauritius, India and Sri Lanka, Indochina, southeastern China, western Malesia, and Australia
- Actinoschoenus repens J.Raynal – Zambia
- Actinoschoenus yunnanensis (C.B.Clarke) Y.C.Tang – Indochina to Assam and Yunnan

=== Formerly placed here ===
Previously, Actinoschoenus was circumscribed more widely, and included five species native to Australia. Those species are now considered to form a separate genus, Scleroschoenus K.L.Wilson, J.J.Bruhl & R.L.Barrett.

- Scleroschoenus arthrostyloides (W.Fitzg.) K.L.Wilson & J.J.Bruhl (as Actinoschoenus arthrostyloides (W.Fitzg.) K.L.Clarke, K.L.Wilson & J.J.Bruhl
- Scleroschoenus glabrispiculus (Rye, R.L.Barrett & M.D.Barrett) K.L.Wilson & J.J.Bruhl (as Actinoschoenus glabrispiculus Rye, R.L.Barrett & M.D.Barrett)
- Scleroschoenus pentagonus (Rye, R.L.Barrett & M.D.Barrett) K.L.Wilson & J.J.Bruhl (as Actinoschoenus pentagonus Rye, R.L.Barrett & M.D.Barrett)
- Scleroschoenus quadricostatus (Rye, R.L.Barrett & M.D.Barrett) K.L.Wilson & J.J.Bruhl (as Actinoschoenus quadricostatus Rye, R.L.Barrett & M.D.Barrett)
- Scleroschoenus ramosus (Rye, R.L.Barrett & M.D.Barrett) K.L.Wilson & J.J.Bruhl (as Actinoschoenus ramosus Rye, R.L.Barrett & M.D.Barrett)
