= Acacia obtriangularis =

Conservation status
- Priority One — Poorly Known Taxa (DEC)

Scientific classification
- Kingdom: Plantae
- Clade: Tracheophytes
- Clade: Angiosperms
- Clade: Eudicots
- Clade: Rosids
- Order: Fabales
- Family: Fabaceae
- Subfamily: Caesalpinioideae
- Clade: Mimosoid clade
- Genus: Acacia
- Species: A. obtriangularis

Binomial name
- Acacia obtriangularis Maslin, M.D.Barrett & R.L.Barrett

Species of legume

Acacia obtriangularis, commonly knowns as Lawley River wattle, is a species of flowering plant in the family Fabaceae, and is endemic to the Kimberley region of Western Australia. It is an erect, single-stemmed shrub with terete, hairy branchlets, phyllodes with one rounded edge, the other edge straight, short cylindrical spikes of golden yellow flowers and linear, narrowly oblong, curved pods.

== Description ==
Acacia obtriangularis is an erect shrub that typically grows to a height of 1.5–2 m (4 ft 11 in – 6 ft 7 in) and has a single stem at the base and many ascending branches. The branchlets are terete with fine, short hairs. The phyllodes are triangular, with the narrower end towards the base and sharply pointed, the upper edge rounded or angled near the gland, the other edge more or less straight, 3–5 mm (0.12–0.20 in) long, 2–3 mm (0.079–0.118 in) wide with 6 to 8 veins. The flowers are golden yellow and borne in short cylindrical spikes 7–10 mm (0.28–0.39 in) long and 4–5 mm (0.16–0.20 in) wide in axils on peduncles 10–12 mm (0.39–0.47 in) long. Flowering has been observed in late March, and the pods are narrowly oblong, 20–50 mm (0.79–1.97 in) long, 0.7–1 mm (0.028–0.039 in) wide, curved, flat and covered with hairs similar to those on the branchlets. The seeds are oblong, 5.0–5.5 mm (0.20–0.22 in) long, 2.8–3.0 mm (0.11–0.12 in) long and shiny dark brown with a cream-coloured aril.

== Taxonomy ==
Acacia obtriangularis was first formally described in 2013 by Bruce Maslin, Matthew David Barrett and Russell Lindsay Barrett in the journal Nuytsia from specimens collected by M.D. and R.L. Barrett near the Lawley River in 2010. The specific epithet (obtriangularis) means 'reversed triangular', referring to the shape of the phyllodes.

It is a part of the larger A. deltoidea group but is easily distinguished from other members by virtue of having its flowers in spikes, and is most closely related to A. froggattii and A. vincentii.

== Distribution and habitat ==
Lawley River wattle is only known from a single large population of more than 1,000 plants, spread over several kilometres near the mouth of the Lawley River in the Northern Kimberley bioregion of Western Australia, where it grows in sand over sheet sandstone.

== Conservation status ==
Acacia obtriangularis is listed as 'Priority One' by the Government of Western Australia Department of Biodiversity, Conservation and Attractions, meaning that it is known from only one or a few locations where it is potentially at risk.

== See also ==
- List of Acacia species
