= Scleroschoenus quadricostatus =

Four-ribbed actinoschoenus

Conservation status
- Priority One — Poorly Known Taxa (DEC)

Scientific classification
- Kingdom: Plantae
- Clade: Tracheophytes
- Clade: Angiosperms
- Clade: Monocots
- Clade: Commelinids
- Order: Poales
- Family: Cyperaceae
- Genus: Scleroschoenus
- Species: S. quadricostatus

Binomial name
- Scleroschoenus quadricostatus (Rye, R.L.Barrett & M.D.Barrett) K.L.Wilson & J.J.Bruhl

Synonyms
- Actinoschoenus quadricostatus Rye, R.L.Barrett & M.D.Barrett

Species of grass-like plant

Scleroschoenus quadricostatus, commonly known as four-ribbed actinoschoenus, is a sedge in the sedge family, Cyperaceae, that is native to Western Australia. It is found in a small area in the Kimberley region.
