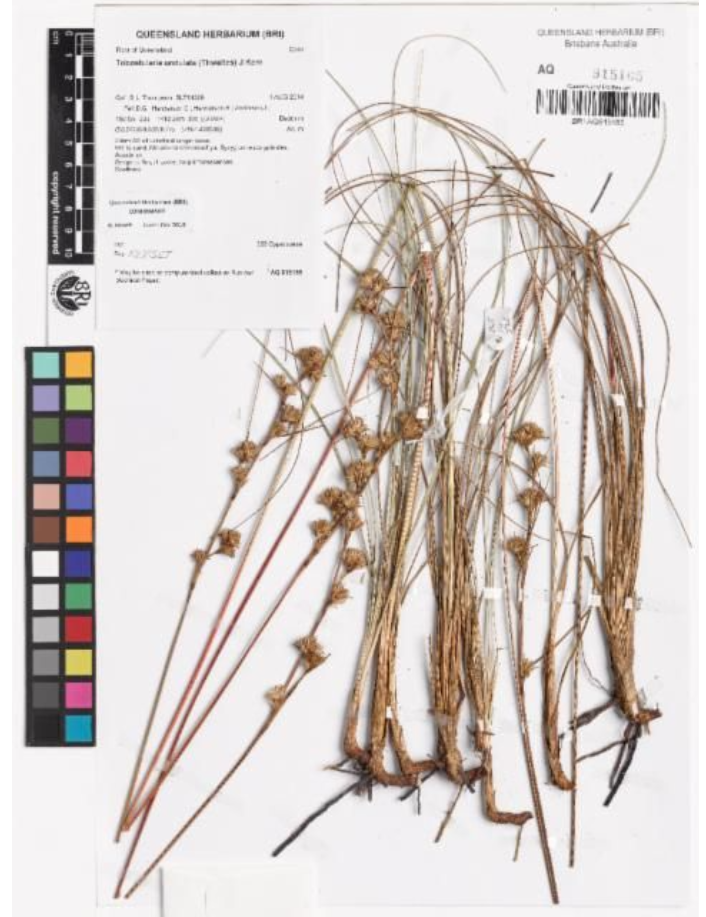

Scientific classification
- Kingdom: Plantae
- Clade: Embryophytes
- Clade: Tracheophytes
- Clade: Angiosperms
- Clade: Monocots
- Clade: Commelinids
- Order: Poales
- Family: Cyperaceae
- Genus: Anthelepis
- Species: A. clarksonii

Binomial name
- Anthelepis clarksonii R.L.Barrett, K.L.Wilson & J.J.Bruhl

= Anthelepis clarksonii =

Species of plant native to Australia

Anthelepis clarksonii is a plant in the Cyperaceae family, first described in 2019 by Russell Barrett, Karen Wilson and Jeremy Bruhl. It is found in Queensland.

The species epithet honours John Richard Clarkson who collected the type specimen.
