= Scleroschoenus =

Scientific classification
- Kingdom: Plantae
- Clade: Tracheophytes
- Clade: Angiosperms
- Clade: Monocots
- Clade: Commelinids
- Order: Poales
- Family: Cyperaceae
- Subfamily: Cyperoideae
- Tribe: Abildgaardieae
- Genus: Scleroschoenus; K.L.Wilson, J.J.Bruhl & R.L.Barrett

Genus of flowering plants

Scleroschoenus is a genus of sedges in the family Cyperaceae. It includes six species native to the Northern Territory and northern Western Australia in northern Australia.

Species in the genus were formerly placed in the genera Actinoschoenus and Fimbristylis.

== Species ==
Six species are accepted.

- Scleroschoenus arthrostyloides (W.Fitzg.) K.L.Wilson & J.J.Bruhl
- Scleroschoenus compositus (Latz) K.L.Wilson & J.J.Bruhl
- Scleroschoenus glabrispiculus (Rye, R.L.Barrett & M.D.Barrett) K.L.Wilson & J.J.Bruhl
- Scleroschoenus pentagonus (Rye, R.L.Barrett & M.D.Barrett) K.L.Wilson & J.J.Bruhl
- Scleroschoenus quadricostatus (Rye, R.L.Barrett & M.D.Barrett) K.L.Wilson & J.J.Bruhl
- Scleroschoenus ramosus (Rye, R.L.Barrett & M.D.Barrett) K.L.Wilson & J.J.Bruhl
