= Scleroschoenus pentagonus =

Five-angled actinoschoenus

Scientific classification
- Kingdom: Plantae
- Clade: Tracheophytes
- Clade: Angiosperms
- Clade: Monocots
- Clade: Commelinids
- Order: Poales
- Family: Cyperaceae
- Genus: Scleroschoenus
- Species: S. pentagonus

Binomial name
- Scleroschoenus pentagonus (Rye, R.L.Barrett & M.D.Barrett) K.L.Wilson & J.J.Bruhl

Synonyms
- Actinoschoenus pentagonus Rye, R.L.Barrett & M.D.Barrett

Species of grass-like plant

Scleroschoenus pentagonus, commonly known as five-angled actinoschoenus, is a flowering plant in the sedge family Cyperaceae. It is native to the Kimberley region of northern Western Australia and the adjacent Northern Territory.

The species was first described as Actinoschoenus pentagonus in 2015, and renamed Scleroschoenus pentagonus in 2021.
