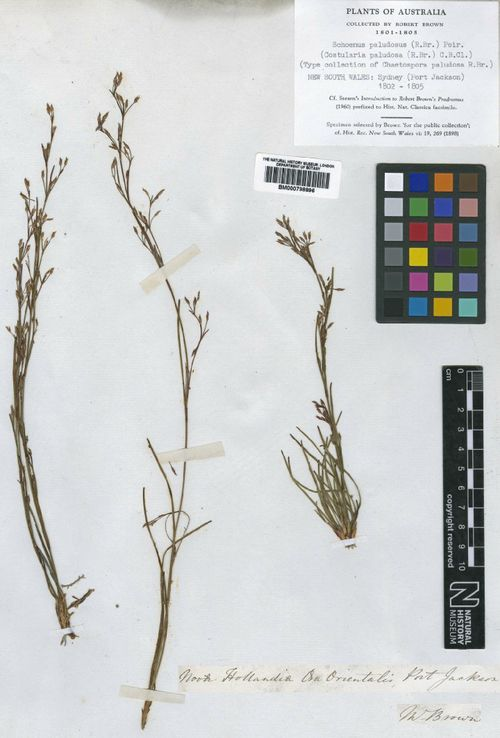

Scientific classification
- Kingdom: Plantae
- Clade: Embryophytes
- Clade: Tracheophytes
- Clade: Angiosperms
- Clade: Monocots
- Clade: Commelinids
- Order: Poales
- Family: Cyperaceae
- Genus: Anthelepis
- Species: A. paludosa

Binomial name
- Anthelepis paludosa (R.Br.) R.L.Barrett, K.L.Wilson & J.J.Bruhl

Synonyms
- Chaetospora paludosa R.Br. Schoenus paludosus (R.Br.) Poir. Tricostularia paludosa (R.Br.) Benth. Helothrix paludosa (R.Br.) Palla; Costularia paludosa (R.Br.) C.B.Clarke

= Anthelepis paludosa =

Species of plant native to Australia

Anthelepis paludosa is a plant in the Cyperaceae family, first described in 1810 by Robert Brown as Chaetospora paludosa, with the current name being given in 2019 with a reassignment to the new genus, Anthelepis, by Russell Barrett, Karen Wilson and Jeremy Bruhl. The species is native to New South Wales and Queensland.
