= Acacia anastomosa =

Carson River wattle

Conservation status
- Priority One — Poorly Known Taxa (DEC)

Scientific classification
- Kingdom: Plantae
- Clade: Tracheophytes
- Clade: Angiosperms
- Clade: Eudicots
- Clade: Rosids
- Order: Fabales
- Family: Fabaceae
- Subfamily: Caesalpinioideae
- Clade: Mimosoid clade
- Genus: Acacia
- Species: A. anastomosa

Binomial name
- Acacia anastomosa Maslin, M.D.Barrett & R.L.Barrett

Species of legume

Acacia anastomosa, also known as Carson River wattle, is a species of flowering plant in the family Fabaceae and is endemic to northern Western Australia. It is a spindly, straggly shrub with many stems, narrowly elliptic phyllodes, 1 or 2 heads of densely flowered spikes in axils, and narrowly oblong pods.

== Description ==
Acacia anastomosa is a spindly, shaggy shrub that typically grows to a height of 1–2 m (3 ft 3 in – 6 ft 7 in) and has smooth, brown bark. Its phyllodes are usually narrowly elliptic, mostly 50–90 mm (2.0–3.5 in) long and 15–25 mm (0.59–0.98 in) wide with 2 to 4 main longitudinal veins. There is usually a gland on the upper edge of the phyllode near the top of the pulvinus or 3 mm (0.12 in) above it. The flowers are arranged in 1 or 2 spikes 10–20 mm (0.39–0.79 in) long in the axils of phyllodes, on a peduncle 8–17 mm (0.31–0.67 in) long. Flowers have been seen in April, late May and mid-June and the fruit is a narrowly oblong pod, narrowed towards the base, crust-like to almost woody, 50–100 mm (2.0–3.9 in) long and 7–10 mm (0.28–0.39 in) wide.

== Taxonomy ==
Acacia anastomosa was first formally described in 2013 by Bruce Maslin, Matthew David Barrett and Russell Lindsay Barrett in the journal Nuytsia from specimens collected near Theda Station Homestead in the north Kimberley region. The specific epithet (anastomosa) means 'formation of a network', referring to the veins in the phyllodes.

== Distribution ==
This species of wattle is native to a small area in the Kimberley region of Western Australia where it is only known from an area south of Kalumburu where it grows on red volcanic soils in open woodland with Eucalyptus tectifica, Corymbia greeniana and Erythrophleum chlorostachys.

== Conservation status ==
Acacia anastomosa is listed as "Priority One" by the Government of Western Australia Department of Biodiversity, Conservation and Attractions, meaning that it is known from only one or a few locations where it is potentially at risk.

== See also ==
- List of Acacia species
