= Anthelepis guillauminii =

Scientific classification
- Kingdom: Plantae
- Clade: Embryophytes
- Clade: Tracheophytes
- Clade: Angiosperms
- Clade: Monocots
- Clade: Commelinids
- Order: Poales
- Family: Cyperaceae
- Genus: Anthelepis
- Species: A. guillauminii

Binomial name
- Anthelepis guillauminii (Kuk.) R.L.Barrett, K.L.Wilson & J.J.Bruhl

Synonyms
- Schoenus guillauminii Tricostularia guillauminii

Species of plant native to New Caledonia

Anthelepis guillauminii is a plant in the Cyperaceae family, first described in 1938 by Georg Kükenthal as Schoenus guillauminii, with the current name being given in 2019 as belonging to the new genus, Anthelepis by Russell Barrett, Karen Wilson and Jeremy Bruhl. The species is native to New Caledonia.

The species epithet honours André Guillaumin.
