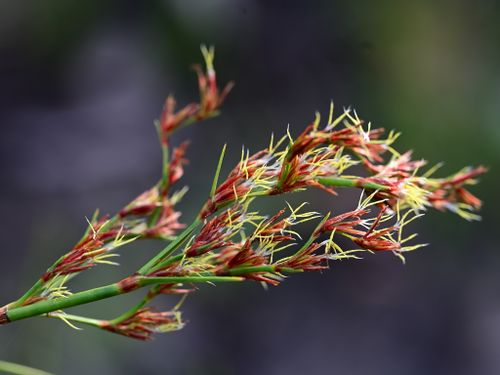

Scientific classification
- Kingdom: Plantae
- Clade: Embryophytes
- Clade: Tracheophytes
- Clade: Angiosperms
- Clade: Monocots
- Clade: Commelinids
- Order: Poales
- Family: Cyperaceae
- Genus: Anthelepis
- Species: A. undulata

Binomial name
- Anthelepis undulata (Thwaites) R.L.Barrett, K.L.Wilson & J.J.Bruhl

Synonyms
- Cladium undulatum Thwaites; Machaerina undulata (Thwaites) T.Koyama; Tricostularia undulata (Thwaites) J.Kern

= Anthelepis undulata =

Species of plant

Anthelepis undulata is a plant in the Cyperaceae family, first described in 1804 by George Henry Kendrick Thwaites as Cladium undulatum (from a plant collected in southern Sri Lanka) with the current name being given in 2019 with a reassignment to the new genus, Anthelepis, by Russell Barrett, Karen Wilson and Jeremy Bruhl.

The species is found from Vietnam to Northern Australia (Queensland, the Northern Territory, and Western Australia). It is native also to Borneo, Hainan, Malaya, New Guinea, Sumatra, and Thailand, and is extinct in Sri Lanka.

== Gallery ==
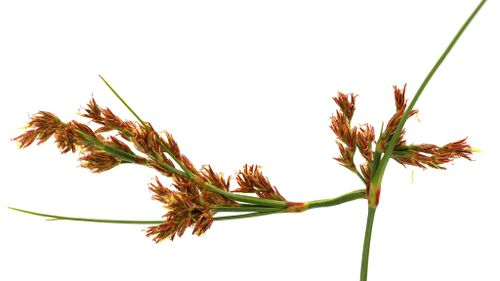

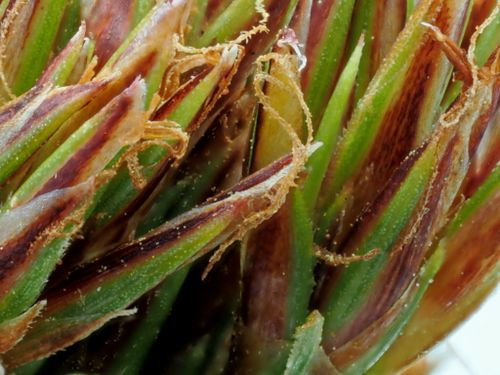

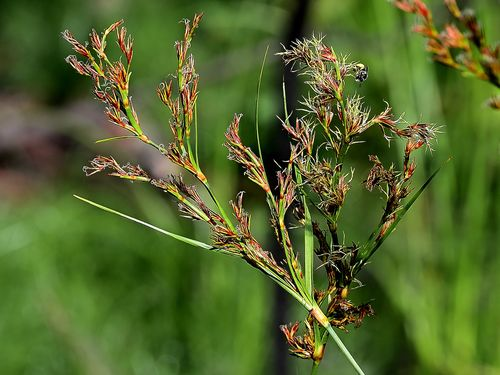

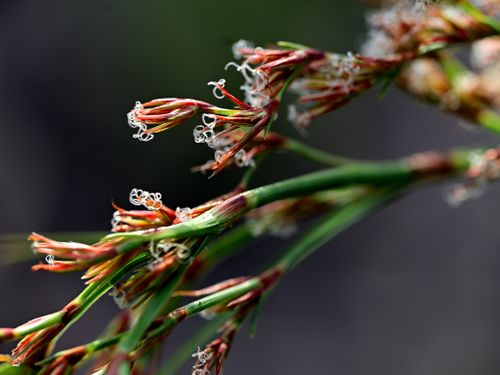
