= Scleroschoenus glabrispiculus =

Smooth actinoschoenus

Conservation status
- Priority Three — Poorly Known Taxa (DEC)

Scientific classification
- Kingdom: Plantae
- Clade: Tracheophytes
- Clade: Angiosperms
- Clade: Monocots
- Clade: Commelinids
- Order: Poales
- Family: Cyperaceae
- Genus: Scleroschoenus
- Species: S. glabrispiculus

Binomial name
- Scleroschoenus glabrispiculus (Rye, R.L.Barrett & M.D.Barrett) K.L.Wilson & J.J.Bruhl

Synonyms
- Actinoschoenus glabrispiculus Rye, R.L.Barrett & M.D.Barrett

Species of grass-like plant

Scleroschoenus glabrispiculus, commonly known as smooth actinoschoenus, is a sedge in the sedge family, Cyperaceae that is native to Western Australia throughout parts of the Kimberley region.
