= Scleroschoenus arthrostyloides =

Hairy actinoschoenus

Scientific classification
- Kingdom: Plantae
- Clade: Tracheophytes
- Clade: Angiosperms
- Clade: Monocots
- Clade: Commelinids
- Order: Poales
- Family: Cyperaceae
- Subfamily: Cyperoideae
- Tribe: Abildgaardieae
- Genus: Scleroschoenus
- Species: S. arthrostyloides

Binomial name
- Scleroschoenus arthrostyloides (W.Fitzg.) K.L.Wilson & J.J.Bruhl

Synonyms
- Actinoschoenus arthrostyloides (W.Fitzg.) K.L.Clarke, K.L.Wilson & J.J.Bruhl; Fimbristylis arthrostyloides W.Fitzg.

Species of grass-like plant

Scleroschoenus arthrostyloides, commonly known as hairy actinoschoenus, is flowering plant in the sedge family, Cyperaceae, that is native to Western Australia throughout parts of the Kimberley region.

The species was first described in 1918 by William Vincent Fitzgerald as Fimbristylis arthrostyloides. It was transferred to the genus Actinoschoenus in 2015 by Kerri Clarke, Karen Wilson, and Jeremy Bruhl. In 2021 it was placed in the new genus Scleroschoenus.

== Etymology ==
The epithet is from the genus Arthrostylis R.Br. with the Greek termination -oides (like), in reference to the similar appearance of this species to that genus.

== Description ==
The plant is perennial, a caespitose sedge, which is 0.3–0.8 m (1 ft 0 in – 2 ft 7 in) high. Culms are 0.5–1 mm (0.020–0.039 in) diameter, overall shape in Terminal spikelets(TS) ± terete but strongly and obtusely 5(6)-ridged, densely covered by short hairs and with much longer hairs scattered along the ridges. Leaves are densely covered by short and long hairs; uppermost leaf is 35–100 mm (1.4–3.9 in) long, with a blade 6–11 mm (0.24–0.43 in) long. For the inflorescence, a head of (1)2–7 somewhat spreading spikelets. For the bracts, the numbers are 2–5, hairy, and the longest bract is the basal; basal bract is 7–10 mm (0.28–0.39 in) long, with a blade 6–8 mm (0.24–0.31 in) long. Spikelets are strongly compressed, narrowly ovate in outline, 7–9 mm (0.28–0.35 in) long, and 1.5–3 mm (0.059–0.118 in) wide. For the glumes, the numbers are 5–7, distichous, with a green keel and pale brown sides; upper glumes narrowly ovate, 6–8 mm (0.24–0.31 in) long, distally minutely hairy, acute, and often apiculate. For stamens, there are usually 3; anther is 3.5–4 mm (0.14–0.16 in)m long. For style, it is undivided for 4.3–5.5 mm (0.17–0.22 in); base is narrowly triangular to triangular in outline, c. 1 mm (0.039 in) long, 0.5 mm (0.020 in) wide; stigmatic branches 3, about as long as undivided portion of style. Nut is with a stipe or contracted base and is 0.6–1 mm (0.024–0.039 in) long; body is whitish to grey-brown, 2–2.5 mm (0.079–0.098 in) long, 1.5–2 mm (0.059–0.079 in) wide, transversely tuberculate-ridged. C3 photosynthetic pathway is inferred from the anatomy. Flowers and fruits are recorded in February and from May to August.

Diagnostic characters: Culms densely hairy, displaying 2 hair types, obtusely 5(6)-ridged. Inflorescence (1–)2–7 spikelets; bracts 2–5, the basal bract longest. Upper glumes 6–8 mm (0.24–0.31 in) long, distally minutely hairy on sides as well as midvein

== Conservation status ==
It is currently known from thirteen locations in Western Australia and six in the adjacent Northern Territory, and sufficiently widespread not to require listing as a priority species.

== Distribution ==
Occurs in open woodland with shrubs on sand associated with sandstone, sometimes occurring on the edges of pools. From the Kimberley region, extending from Mitchell Plateau and Boongaree Island south to near Walcott Inlet, east to Bullo River in the Northern Territory.

Here are the classifications of regions the species are found:

Beard’s Provinces: Northern Province.

IBRA regions: Northern Kimberley.

IBRA subregions: Mitchell.

IMCRA regions: Kimberley.

Local Government Areas (LGAs): Derby/west Kimberley, Wyndham-East Kimberley.
