= Acacia claviseta =

Club-tipped whorled wattle

Conservation status
- Priority Three — Poorly Known Taxa (DEC)

Scientific classification
- Kingdom: Plantae
- Clade: Tracheophytes
- Clade: Angiosperms
- Clade: Eudicots
- Clade: Rosids
- Order: Fabales
- Family: Fabaceae
- Subfamily: Caesalpinioideae
- Clade: Mimosoid clade
- Genus: Acacia
- Species: A. claviseta

Binomial name
- Acacia claviseta Maslin, M.D.Barrett & R.L.Barrett

Species of legume

Acacia claviseta, also known as the club-tipped whorled wattle, is a species of flowering plant in the family Fabaceae and is endemic to north-western Australia. It is an erect, slightly sticky shrub with many branches, linear phyllodes in whorls of 9 to 16, heads of golden yellow flowers, and oblong to narrowly oblong pods.

== Description ==
Acacia claviseta is an erect, slightly sticky shrub with many branches and that typically grows to a height of 0.6–0.8 m (2 ft 0 in – 2 ft 7 in) and has branchlets covered with soft hairs. The phyllodes are linear, mostly 4–7 mm (0.16–0.28 in) long, 0.3–0.4 mm (0.012–0.016 in) wide, and arranged in whorls of 9 to 16. There are erect, bristly stipules 1.5–2.5 m (4 ft 11 in – 8 ft 2 in) long at the base of the phyllodes. The flowers are borne in a head in axils on a peduncle 15–30 mm (0.59–1.18 in) long each head 8–9 mm (0.31–0.35 in) in diameter with 30 to 42 golden yellow flowers. Flowering has been observed from February/March to July/August, and the pods are oblong to narrowly oblong, 10–35 mm (0.39–1.38 in) long nd 10–35 mm (0.39–1.38 in) long and 6–8 mm (0.24–0.31 in) wide, thinly leathery to crust-like, the seeds 4.0–5.5 mm (0.16–0.22 in) long.

== Taxonomy ==
Acacia claviseta was first formally described in 2013 by Bruce Maslin, Matthew Barrett and Russell Barrett in the journal Nuytsia from specimens collected by Russell Barrett near Pompeys Pillar in the Warmun Community. The specific epithet (claviseta) means 'club-bristle', referring to the point on the end of the phyllodes.

== Distribution and habitat ==
Club-tipped whorled wattle is native to an area in the Northern Territory and the eastern Kimberley region of Western Australia. It is found in a few scattered places south of Kununurra on Bedford Downs Station, Osmond Range and around Pompeys Pillar to the north of Warmun in Western Australia with its range extending east to scattered populations in the Keep River National Park in the Northern Territory around 100 km (62 mi) to the north east. It mostly grows on scree slopes, sand flats, sandstone ridges and sandy lenses among sandstone boulders in scrubland communities.

== Conservation status ==
Acacia claviseta is listed as "Priority Three" meaning that it is poorly known and known from only a few locations but is not under imminent threat.

== See also ==
- List of Acacia species
