= Boronia interrex =

Regent River boronia

Conservation status
- Priority Two — Poorly Known Taxa (DEC)

Scientific classification
- Kingdom: Plantae
- Clade: Tracheophytes
- Clade: Angiosperms
- Clade: Eudicots
- Clade: Rosids
- Order: Sapindales
- Family: Rutaceae
- Genus: Boronia
- Species: B. interrex

Binomial name
- Boronia interrex R.L.Barrett, M.D.Barrett & Duretto

Species of flowering plant

Boronia interrex, commonly known as the Regent River boronia, is a plant in the citrus family, Rutaceae and is endemic to a small area in the Kimberley region of Western Australia. It is an erect, sometimes low-lying shrub with pinnate leaves, cream-coloured to pale pink sepals and pink petals, the sepals longer and wider than the petals.

== Description ==
Boronia interrex is an erect, spreading sometimes low-lying shrub that grows to about 80 cm (30 in) high and 150 cm (60 in) wide. The leaves are pinnate, 10–37 mm (0.4–1 in) long and 8–16 mm (0.3–0.6 in) wide in outline, with mostly five to eleven leaflets. The end leaflet is 6–11.5 mm (0.2–0.5 in) long and 3–5 mm (0.1–0.2 in) wide and the side leaflets are shorter. The flowers are borne singly in leaf axils on a pedicel up to 5.5 mm (0.2 in) long. The four sepals are hairy, cream-coloured to pale pink, narrow egg-shaped, 3.5–5.5 mm (0.14–0.22 in) long, 1–1.5 mm (0.039–0.059 in) wide, longer and wider than the petals. The four petals are pale pink with a darker base, 2.5–4 mm (0.098–0.16 in) long and 0.5–1 mm (0.02–0.04 in) wide and hairy. The eight stamens are hairy with those nearest the petals slightly longer than those near the sepals.

== Taxonomy and naming ==
Boronia interrex was first formally described in 2015 by Russell Barrett, Matthew Barrett and Marco Duretto and the description was published in Nuytsia from a specimen collected in the Prince Regent National Park. The specific epithet (interrex) is a Latin word meaning "a regent" or "temporary king", referring to the type location.

== Distribution and habitat ==
Regent River boronia is only known from a single sandstone mesa in the Prince Regent National Park where it grows with low shrubs including those in the genera Acacia, Grevillea and Triodia.

== Conservation ==
Boronia interrex is classified as "Priority Two" by the Western Australian Government Department of Parks and Wildlife meaning that it is poorly known and from only one or a few locations.
