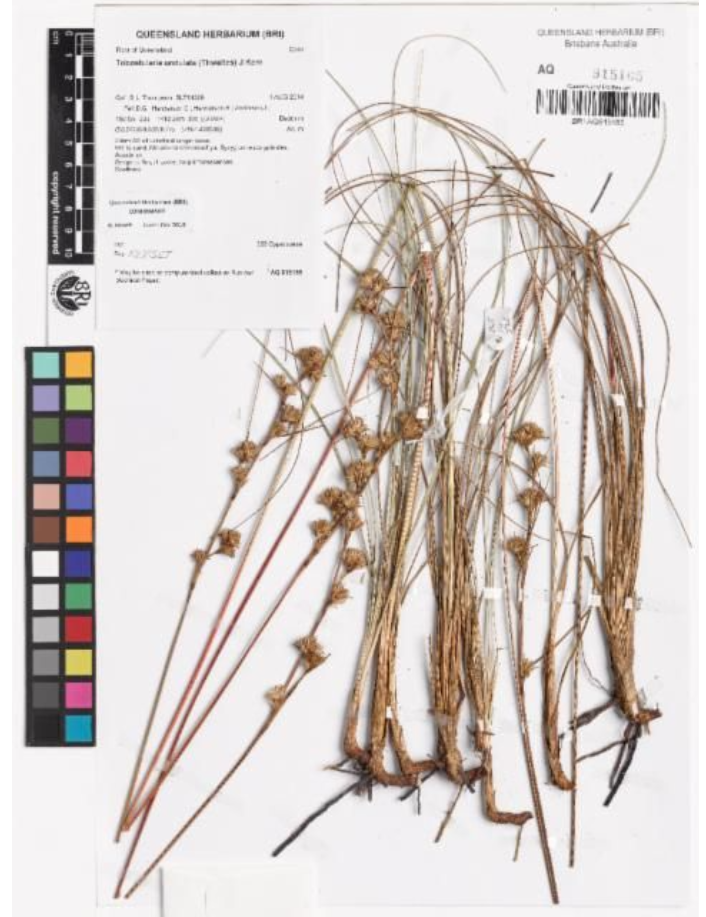
- Anthelepis clarksonii

Scientific classification
- Kingdom: Plantae
- Clade: Tracheophytes
- Clade: Angiosperms
- Clade: Monocots
- Clade: Commelinids
- Order: Poales
- Family: Cyperaceae
- Genus: Anthelepis; R.L.Barrett, K.L.Wilson & J.J.Bruhl

= Anthelepis =

Genus of flowering plants

Anthelepis is a genus of flowering plants belonging to the family Cyperaceae, and was first described in 2019 by the Australian botanists, Russell Barrett, Karen Wilson and Jeremy Bruhl.

Its native range is from Sri Lanka to Hainan, China, and includes Australia, and New Caledonia, and its species are generally found in tropical wetlands.

== Etymology ==
The genus name derives from the Greek words: anthele (the plume of a reed), and lepis (a scale), and refers to the scale-like bristles at the nutlet's base.

== Species ==
Accepted species are:

- Anthelepis clarksonii R.L.Barrett, K.L.Wilson & J.J.Bruhl
- Anthelepis guillauminii (Kük.) R.L.Barrett, K.L.Wilson & J.J.Bruhl
- Anthelepis paludosa (R.Br.) R.L.Barrett, K.L.Wilson & J.J.Bruhl
- Anthelepis undulata (Thwaites) R.L.Barrett, K.L.Wilson & J.J.Bruhl
