= Scleroschoenus compositus =

Conservation status
- Priority Three — Poorly Known Taxa (DEC)

Scientific classification
- Kingdom: Plantae
- Clade: Tracheophytes
- Clade: Angiosperms
- Clade: Monocots
- Clade: Commelinids
- Order: Poales
- Family: Cyperaceae
- Genus: Scleroschoenus
- Species: S. compositus

Binomial name
- Scleroschoenus compositus (Latz) K.L.Wilson & J.J.Bruhl

Synonyms
- Fimbristylis composita Latz

Species of flowering plant

Scleroschoenus compositus is a species of flowering plant in the sedge family, Cyperaceae. It is endemic to the Northern Territory of Australia.
