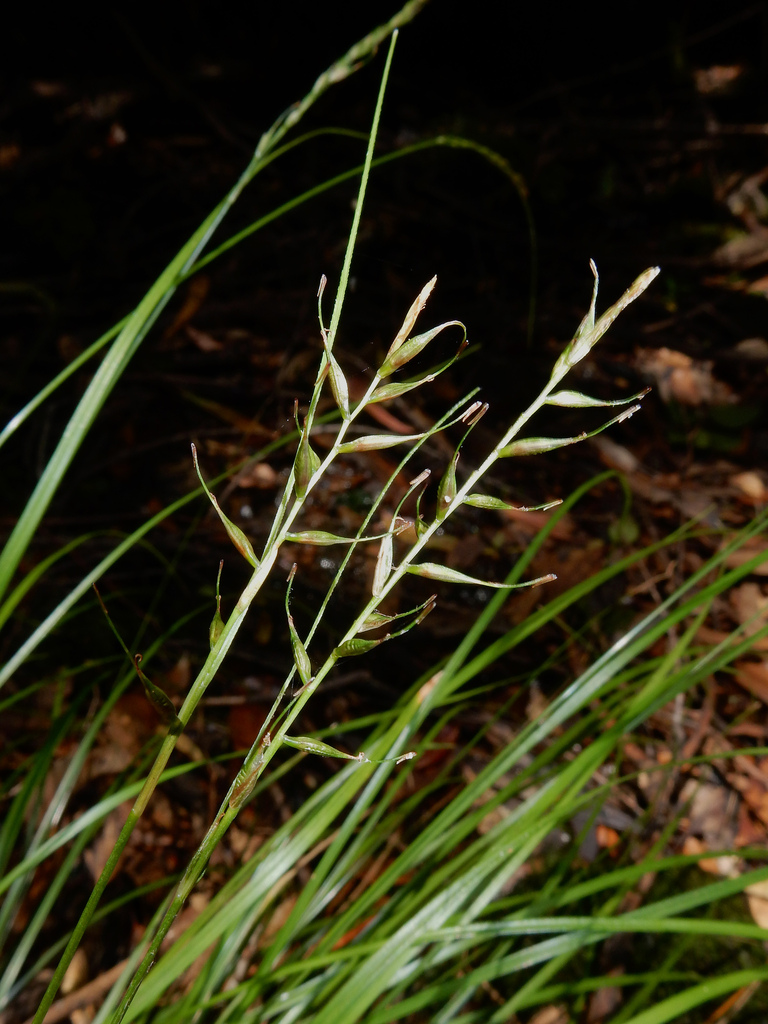

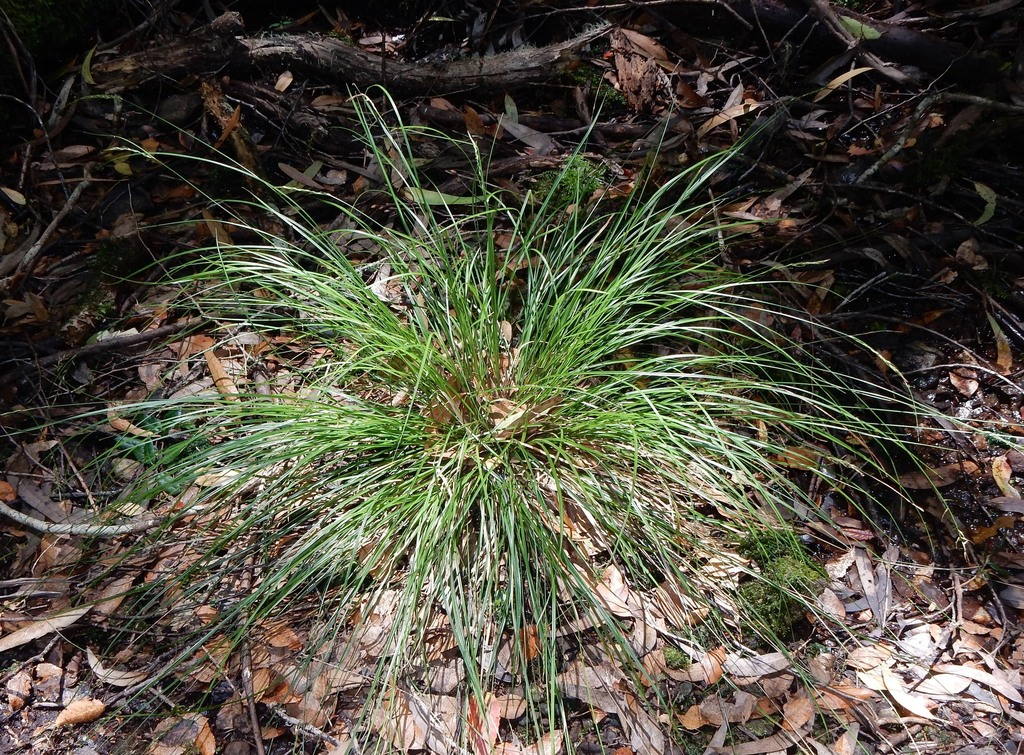
- Ebor, NSW, 2021-01-14

Scientific classification
- Kingdom: Plantae
- Clade: Tracheophytes
- Clade: Angiosperms
- Clade: Monocots
- Clade: Commelinids
- Order: Poales
- Family: Cyperaceae
- Genus: Carex
- Species: C. nemoralis

Binomial name
- Carex nemoralis (K.L.Wilson) K.L.Wilson

Synonyms
- Uncinia nemoralis K.L.Wilson

= Carex nemoralis =

Species of flowering plant

Carex nemoralis is a plant species in the Cyperaceae (sedge) family. It was first described in 1994 as Uncinia nemoralis by the Australian botanist Karen Wilson, and was transferred to the genus, Carex, in 2015 by the Global Carex Group.

It is endemic to Australia where it is found in Victoria and New South Wales, in rainforested mountainous areas, and often along creeks.
