= Cyperus hesperius =

Scientific classification
- Kingdom: Plantae
- Clade: Tracheophytes
- Clade: Angiosperms
- Clade: Monocots
- Clade: Commelinids
- Order: Poales
- Family: Cyperaceae
- Genus: Cyperus
- Species: C. hesperius

Binomial name
- Cyperus hesperius K.L.Wilson

Species of plant

Cyperus hesperius is a sedge of the family Cyperaceae that is native to Australia.

The perennial sedge typically grows to a height of 0.3 to 0.4 metres (1.0 to 1.3 ft) and has a tufted habit and produces yellow-brown flowers.

In Western Australia it is found on rocky hillsides in the Pilbara region where it grows in red sandy-loamy soils.

The species was first described in 1991 by Karen Wilson. There are no synonyms.

== See also ==
- List of Cyperus species
