= Cyperus portae-tartari =

Scientific classification
- Kingdom: Plantae
- Clade: Tracheophytes
- Clade: Angiosperms
- Clade: Monocots
- Clade: Commelinids
- Order: Poales
- Family: Cyperaceae
- Genus: Cyperus
- Species: C. portae-tartari

Binomial name
- Cyperus portae-tartari K.L.Wilson

Species of plant

Cyperus portae-tartari is a sedge of the family Cyperaceae that is native to Australia, and found in the Northern Territory and Western Australia.

The robust perennial sedge typically grows to a height of 0.2 to 0.9 metres (0.7 to 3.0 ft) and has a tufted habit. It blooms between February and March producing brown flowers.

The species was first described in 1980 by Karen Wilson.

== See also ==
- List of Cyperus species
