= Cyperus eglobosus =

Scientific classification
- Kingdom: Plantae
- Clade: Tracheophytes
- Clade: Angiosperms
- Clade: Monocots
- Clade: Commelinids
- Order: Poales
- Family: Cyperaceae
- Genus: Cyperus
- Species: C. eglobosus

Binomial name
- Cyperus eglobosus K.L.Wilson, 1994

Species of sedge

Cyperus eglobosus is a species of sedge that is native to Queensland and New South Wales in eastern Australia.

== Description ==
Cyperus eglobosus is a small, tufted sedge that typically grows to a height of 20-50 cm. The stems are trigonous (three-angled) and smooth. The leaves are 1-2 mm wide and are arranged in a basal rosette. The inflorescence is a digitate cluster of 4-25 spikelets, without branches, or rarely a solitary spikelet.

== Distribution ==
The species is native to Queensland and New South Wales in eastern Australia. It mostly grows in the seasonally dry tropical biome, where it can be found in a variety of habitats, including woodlands, forests, and grasslands.

== Environment ==
Cyperus eglobosus is pollinated by insects. The fruits are dispersed by wind. The species is an important food source for a variety of animals, including birds, insects, and rodents.

== Conservation ==
Cyperus eglobosus is not considered to be at risk of extinction. However, it is threatened by habitat loss and fragmentation. The species is protected under the Queensland Nature Conservation Act 1992 and the New South Wales Threatened Species Conservation Act 1995.

== See also ==
- List of Cyperus species
