= Cyperus cracens =

Scientific classification
- Kingdom: Plantae
- Clade: Tracheophytes
- Clade: Angiosperms
- Clade: Monocots
- Clade: Commelinids
- Order: Poales
- Family: Cyperaceae
- Genus: Cyperus
- Species: C. cracens

Binomial name
- Cyperus cracens K.L.Wilson

Species of plant

Cyperus cracens is a sedge of the family Cyperaceae that is native to northern and north western parts of Australia.

The perennial sedge typically grows to a height of 0.35 to 0.8 metres (1.1 to 2.6 ft) in height and has a tufted habit and produces brown flowers.

The species was first described by the botanist Karen Louise Wilson in 1991 in the journal Telopea.

It is found in rock crevices and seepage areas on sandstone hills in the Kimberley region of Western Australia and is also found in the Northern Territory.

== See also ==
- List of Cyperus species
