= Gahnia halmaturina =

Scientific classification
- Kingdom: Plantae
- Clade: Tracheophytes
- Clade: Angiosperms
- Clade: Monocots
- Clade: Commelinids
- Order: Poales
- Family: Cyperaceae
- Genus: Gahnia
- Species: G. halmaturina

Binomial name
- Gahnia halmaturina R.L.Barrett & K.L.Wilson, 2012

Species of plant

Gahnia halmaturina is a tussock-forming perennial in the family Cyperaceae, that is native to parts of South Australia.
