= Cyperus centralis =

Scientific classification
- Kingdom: Plantae
- Clade: Tracheophytes
- Clade: Angiosperms
- Clade: Monocots
- Clade: Commelinids
- Order: Poales
- Family: Cyperaceae
- Genus: Cyperus
- Species: C. centralis

Binomial name
- Cyperus centralis K.L.Wilson

Species of plant endemic to Australia

Cyperus centralis is a sedge of the family Cyperaceae that is native to arid areas of central Australia.

The perennial sedge typically grows to a height of 0.4 to 1.1 metres (1.3 to 3.6 ft) and has a slender tufted habit and produces brown flowers.

It is found in arid areas of the southern part of the Northern Territory, the northern part of South Australia and Western Australia. In Western Australia it is found in rocky gorges, around rock holes, in gullies and around stream beds the Mid West, Pilbara and Goldfields-Esperance regions where it is found in rocky gorges, in and around rock-holes and along stream banks growing in sandy soils.

It was first described in 1991 by Karen Wilson. There are no synonyms.

== See also ==
- List of Cyperus species
