= Carex austrosulcata =

Scientific classification
- Kingdom: Plantae
- Clade: Tracheophytes
- Clade: Angiosperms
- Clade: Monocots
- Clade: Commelinids
- Order: Poales
- Family: Cyperaceae
- Genus: Carex
- Species: C. austrosulcata

Binomial name
- Carex austrosulcata K.L.Wilson

Species of grass-like plant

Carex austrosulcata, commonly known as small hook sedge, is a sedge that is found in south eastern parts of mainland Australia.

== See also ==
- List of Carex species
