= Cyperus astartodes =

Scientific classification
- Kingdom: Plantae
- Clade: Tracheophytes
- Clade: Angiosperms
- Clade: Monocots
- Clade: Commelinids
- Order: Poales
- Family: Cyperaceae
- Genus: Cyperus
- Species: C. astartodes

Binomial name
- Cyperus astartodes K.L.Wilson

Species of plant endemic to Australia

Cyperus astartodes is a sedge of the family Cyperaceae that is native to northern parts of Australia.

The perennial sedge typically grows to a height of 0.3 to 1 metre (1.0 to 3.3 ft) and has a tufted habit. The plant blooms between April and May producing yellow-brown flowers.

In Western Australia it is found on rocky slopes and outcrops in the Kimberley region where it grows in sandy-loamy soils often around sandstone. It is also found in the Northern Territory.

The species was first described in 1991 by Karen Wilson.

== See also ==
- List of Cyperus species
