= Cyperus orgadophilus =

Scientific classification
- Kingdom: Plantae
- Clade: Tracheophytes
- Clade: Angiosperms
- Clade: Monocots
- Clade: Commelinids
- Order: Poales
- Family: Cyperaceae
- Genus: Cyperus
- Species: C. orgadophilus

Binomial name
- Cyperus orgadophilus K.L.Wilson

Species of plant

Cyperus orgadophilus is a sedge of the family Cyperaceae that is native to Australia, in Western Australia, the Northern Territory, and Queensland.

The rhizomatous perennial sedge typically grows to a height of 0.3 to 0.8 metres (1.0 to 2.6 ft). It is found in low-lying areas in sandy soils over laterite.

The species was first described in 1991 by Karen Wilson.

== See also ==
- List of Cyperus species
