= Carex flaccida =

Scientific classification
- Kingdom: Plantae
- Clade: Tracheophytes
- Clade: Angiosperms
- Clade: Monocots
- Clade: Commelinids
- Order: Poales
- Family: Cyperaceae
- Genus: Carex
- Species: C. flaccida

Binomial name
- Carex flaccida (S.T.Blake) K.L.Wilson

Synonyms
- Uncinia flaccida S.T.Blake

Species of grass-like plant

Carex flaccida is a perennial sedge of the Cyperaceae family that is native to eastern parts of Australia.

== See also ==
- List of Carex species
