= Cyperus blakeanus =

Scientific classification
- Kingdom: Plantae
- Clade: Tracheophytes
- Clade: Angiosperms
- Clade: Monocots
- Clade: Commelinids
- Order: Poales
- Family: Cyperaceae
- Genus: Cyperus
- Species: C. blakeanus

Binomial name
- Cyperus blakeanus K.L.Wilson

Species of plant endemic to Australia

Cyperus blakeanus is a sedge of the family Cyperaceae that is native to Australia.

The perennial sedge typically grows to a height of 0.25 to 0.55 metres (0.8 to 1.8 ft) and has a caespitose habit. The plant blooms between April and May producing green-brown flowers.

In Western Australia it is found in the Kimberley, Pilbara, Goldfields-Esperance regions where it grows in red sandy-loamy soils.

It was first described in 1991 by Karen Wilson, with the species epithet, blakeanus, honouring Stanley Thatcher Blake "who contributed so greatly to the taxonomic understanding of Australasian Cyperaceae".

== See also ==
- List of Cyperus species
