= Goodenia psammophila =

Scientific classification
- Kingdom: Plantae
- Clade: Tracheophytes
- Clade: Angiosperms
- Clade: Eudicots
- Clade: Asterids
- Order: Asterales
- Family: Goodeniaceae
- Genus: Goodenia
- Species: G. psammophila

Binomial name
- Goodenia psammophila L.W.Sage & M.D.Barrett

Species of plant

Goodenia psammophila is a species of flowering plant in the family Goodeniaceae and endemic to the Kimberley region of Western Australia. It is a prostrate or erect annual herb with narrow lance-shaped to egg-shaped leaves with the narrower end towards the base, and racemes of yellow flowers with brownish or whitish lobes.

== Description ==
Goodenia psammophila is a prostrate or erect annual herb that typically grows to a height of 50 cm (20 in) with multiple stems. The leaves at the base of the plant are narrow lance-shaped to egg-shaped leaves with the narrower end towards the base, 10–91 mm (0.39–3.58 in) long and 3–21 mm (0.12–0.83 in) wide, sometimes with toothed or pinnatisect edges. The stem leaves are linear, decreasing is size towards the tips of the stems. The flowers are arranged in leafy racemes, each flower on a pedicel 11–37 mm (0.43–1.46 in) long. The sepals are narrow elliptic to linear, 1–2.1 mm (0.039–0.083 in) long and the corolla yellow with brownish or whitish lobes and 6.5–9.2 mm (0.26–0.36 in) long. The lower lobes of the corolla are about 3 mm (0.12 in) long with wings about 1.5 mm (0.059 in) wide. Flowering mainly occurs between December and February and the fruit is an elliptic capsule 3.5–5 mm (0.14–0.20 in) long.

== Taxonomy and naming ==
Goodenia psammophila was first formally described in 2001 by Leigh William Sage and Matthew David Barrett in the journal Nuytsia from material collected by Barrett east of Mount Agnes in the West Kimberley region in 1998. The specific epithet (psammophila) means "sand-loving", referring to the usual habitat of this species.

In the same journal, Sage and Barrett described two subspecies and the names are accepted by the Australian Plant Census:

- Goodenia psammophila subsp. hiddinsiana L.W.Sage & M.D.Barrett, usually an erect plant with dark-headed glandular hairs on the flower parts;
- Goodenia psammophila L.W.Sage & M.D.Barrett subsp. psammophila, usually a prostrate plant with simple hairs.

The subspecies name (hiddinsiana) honours Major Les Hiddins.

== Distribution and habitat ==
This goodenia grows in sandy soil on flats, ridges and near creeks in the Northern Kimberley biogeographic region in Western Australia.

== Conservation status ==
Goddenia psammophila subsp. psammophila is classified as "Priority Three" by the Government of Western Australia Department of Parks and Wildlife meaning that it is poorly known and known from only a few locations but is not under imminent threat, but subspecies hiddinsiana is classified as "Priority Two" by the Western Australian Government Department of Parks and Wildlife meaning that it is poorly known and from only one or a few locations.
