= Acacia mackenziei =

Norm's whorled wattle

Conservation status
- Priority One — Poorly Known Taxa (DEC)

Scientific classification
- Kingdom: Plantae
- Clade: Tracheophytes
- Clade: Angiosperms
- Clade: Eudicots
- Clade: Rosids
- Order: Fabales
- Family: Fabaceae
- Subfamily: Caesalpinioideae
- Clade: Mimosoid clade
- Genus: Acacia
- Species: A. mackenziei

Binomial name
- Acacia mackenziei Maslin & R.L.Barrett

Species of legume

Acacia mackenziei commonly known as Norm's whorled wattle, is a species of flowering plant in the family Fabaceae and is endemic to a small area in the Kimberley region of Western Australia. It is a spindly, single-stemmed, erect shrub with whorls of linear phyllodes, heads of yellow flowers, and narrowly oblong pods.

== Description ==
Acacia mackenziei is a spindly, single-stemmed, sparingly branched, erect shrub 1–2 m (3 ft 3 in – 6 ft 7 in) high with branchlets densely covered with soft hairs. Its phyllodes are arranged linear, mostly flat, straight to slightly curved, 4–10 mm (0.16–0.39 in) long, 0.4–0.7 mm (0.016–0.028 in) wide, covered with soft hairs, and arranged in whorls of 14 to 20. There are longitudinal veins on the lower surface and bristle-like, linear stipules at the base of the phyllodes. The flowers are yellow and borne in heads of 35 to 45 on hairy peduncles 10–17 mm (0.39–0.67 in) long. Flowering apparently occurs from the late wet season at the end of January to at least early April, and the pods are almost sessile, narrowly oblong 25–50 mm (0.98–1.97 in) long, 6–7 mm (0.24–0.28 in) wide and flat, but raised over the seeds along the midline. The seeds are irregularly oblong to cube-shaped or widely elliptic, 4.0–4.5 mm (0.16–0.18 in) long and slightly shiny black.

== Taxonomy ==
Acacia mackenziei was first formally described in 2014 by Bruce Maslin and Russell Barrett in the journal Nuytsia from specimens collected south-east of Kununurra in 2013. The specific epithet (mackenziei) honours Norman McKenzie, senior principal research scientist with the Western Australian Department of Parks and Wildlife.

== Distribution and habitat ==
Norm's whorled wattle is only known from a single sandstone range south-east of Kununurra, in the Victoria Bonaparte bioregion, where it grows on both sides of a high ridge, dissected by a narrow gorge.

== Conservation status ==
Acacia mackenziei is listed as 'Priority One' by the Government of Western Australia Department of Biodiversity, Conservation and Attractions, meaning that it is known from only one or a few locations where it is potentially at risk.

== See also ==
- List of Acacia species
