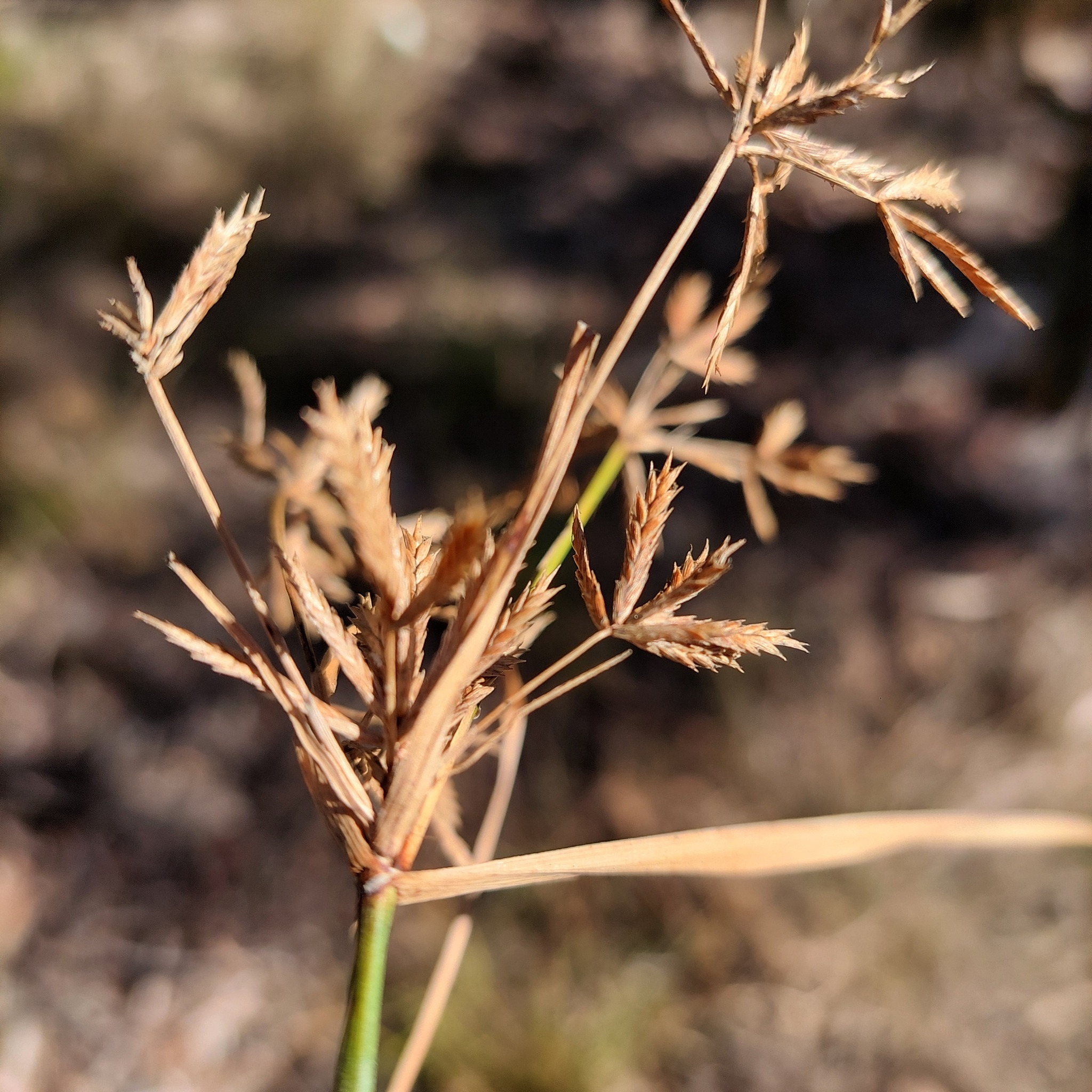

Scientific classification
- Kingdom: Plantae
- Clade: Tracheophytes
- Clade: Angiosperms
- Clade: Monocots
- Clade: Commelinids
- Order: Poales
- Family: Cyperaceae
- Genus: Cyperus
- Species: C. isabellinus

Binomial name
- Cyperus isabellinus K.L.Wilson, 1991

= Cyperus isabellinus =

Species of sedge

Cyperus isabellinus is a species of sedge that is native to north eastern Australia, and was first described in 1991 by Karen Wilson.

The species epithet, isabellinus, refers to the tawnish-yellow glumes.

== Images ==
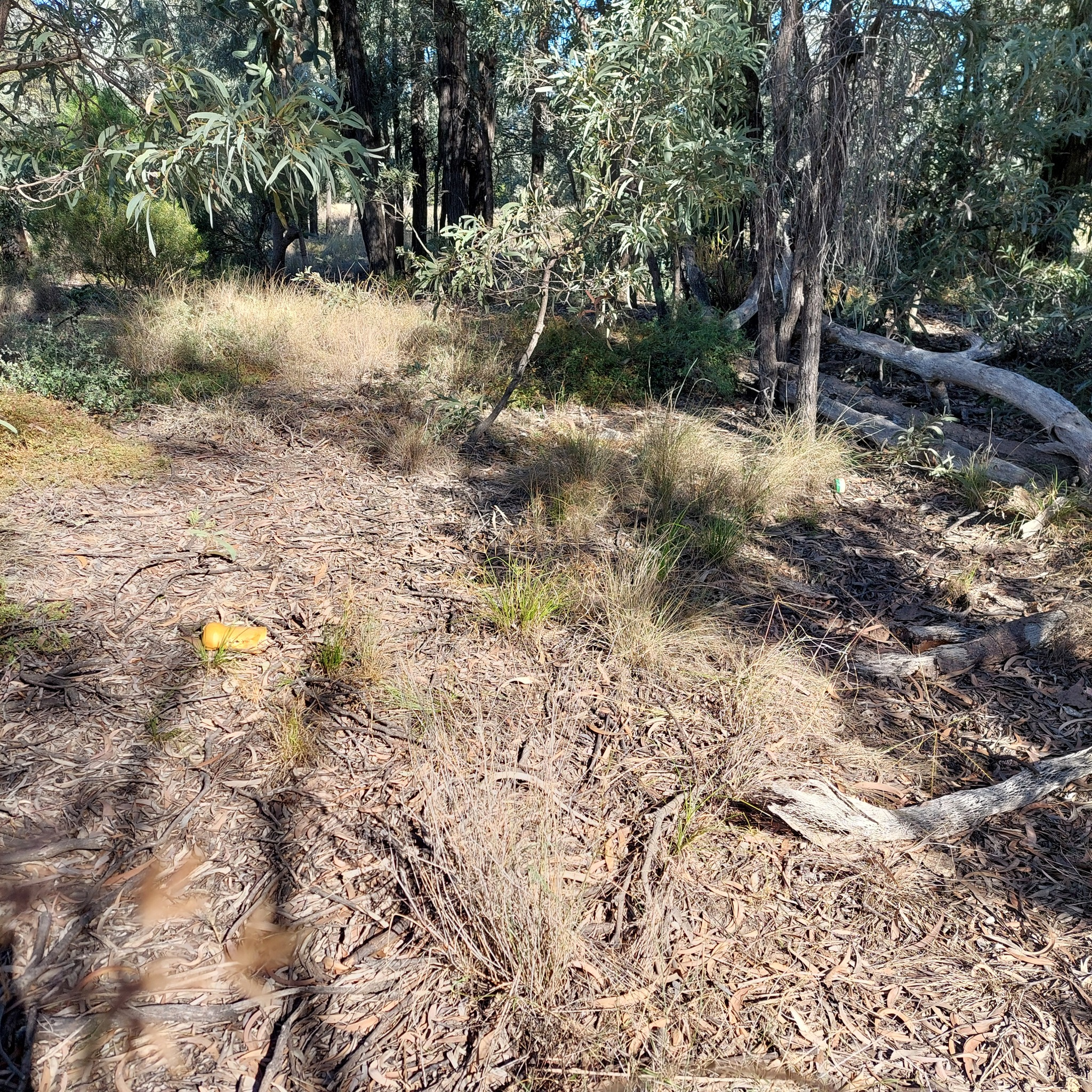
habitat

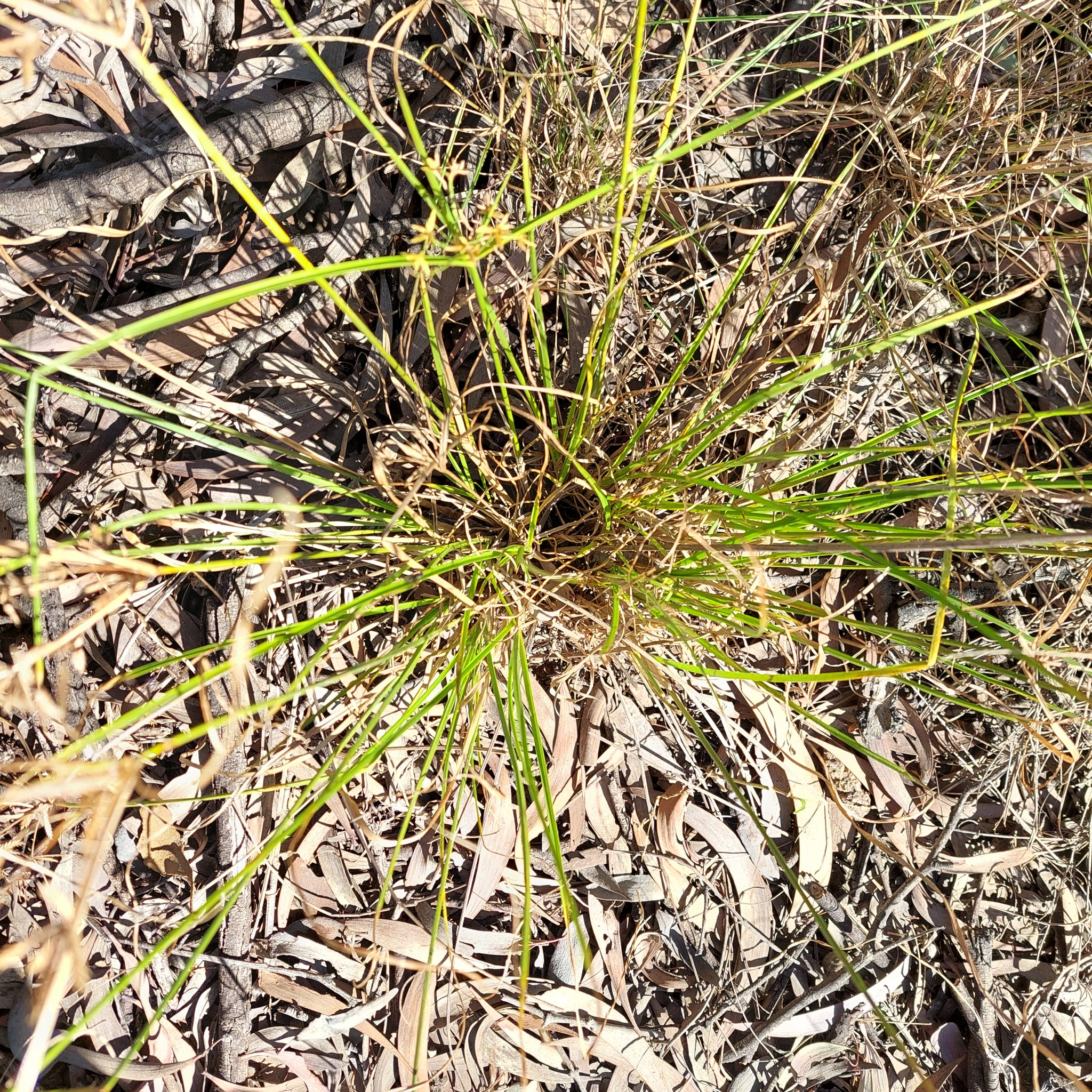
plant

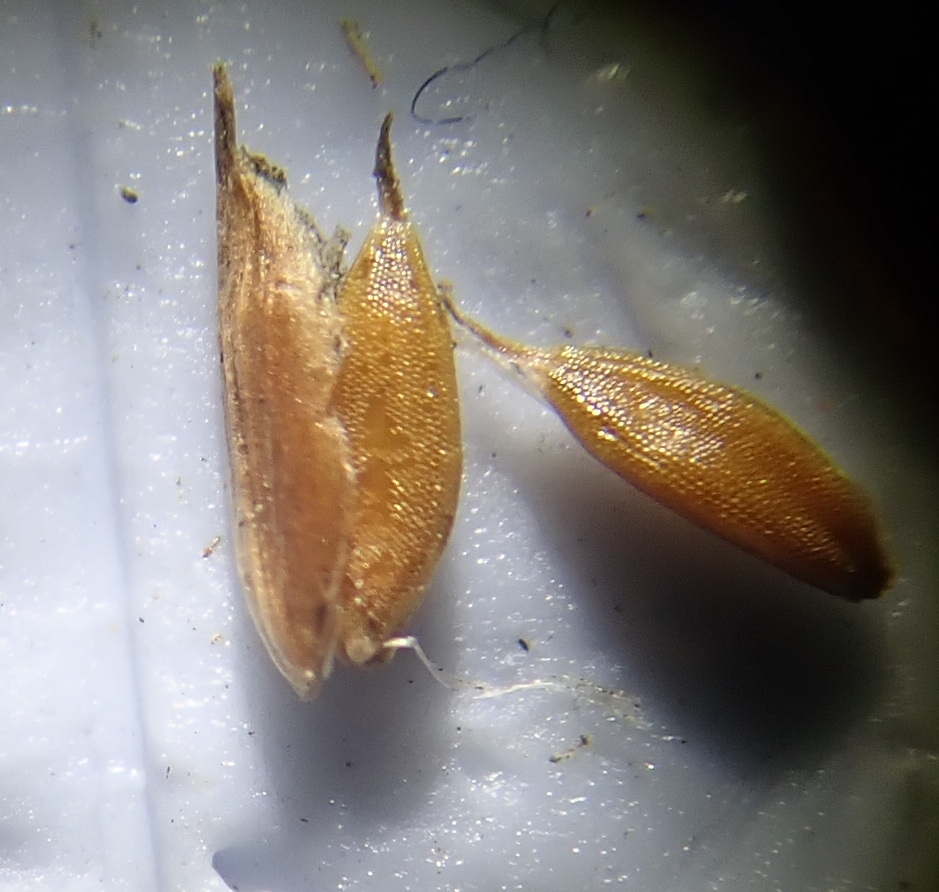
glume & nut

== See also ==
- List of Cyperus species
