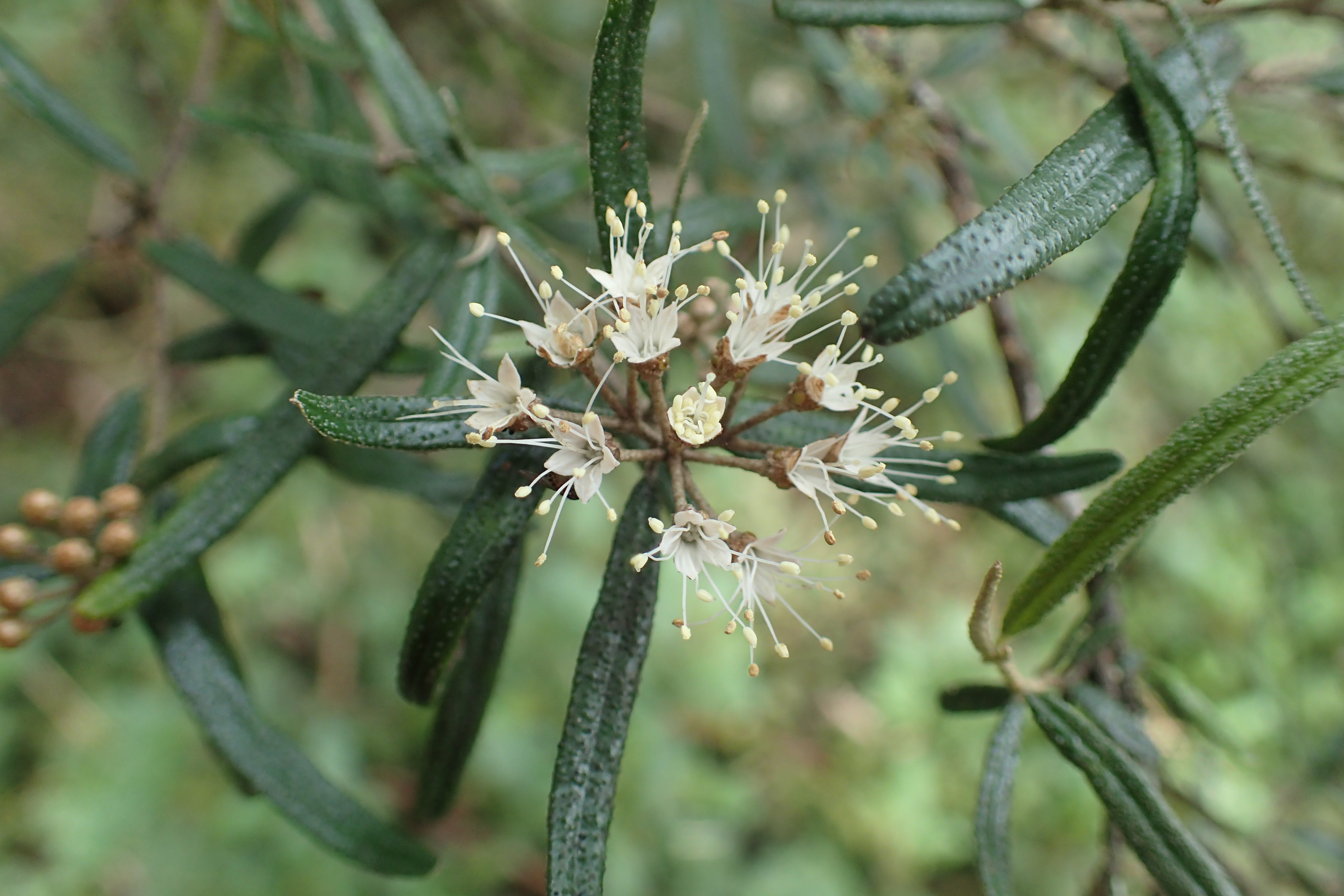

Scientific classification
- Kingdom: Plantae
- Clade: Tracheophytes
- Clade: Angiosperms
- Clade: Eudicots
- Clade: Rosids
- Order: Sapindales
- Family: Rutaceae
- Genus: Phebalium
- Species: P. verrucosum

Binomial name
- Phebalium verrucosum (Paul G.Wilson) I.Telford & J.J.Bruhl

Synonyms
- Phebalium squamulosum subsp. verrucosum Paul G.Wilson

= Phebalium verrucosum =

Species of shrub

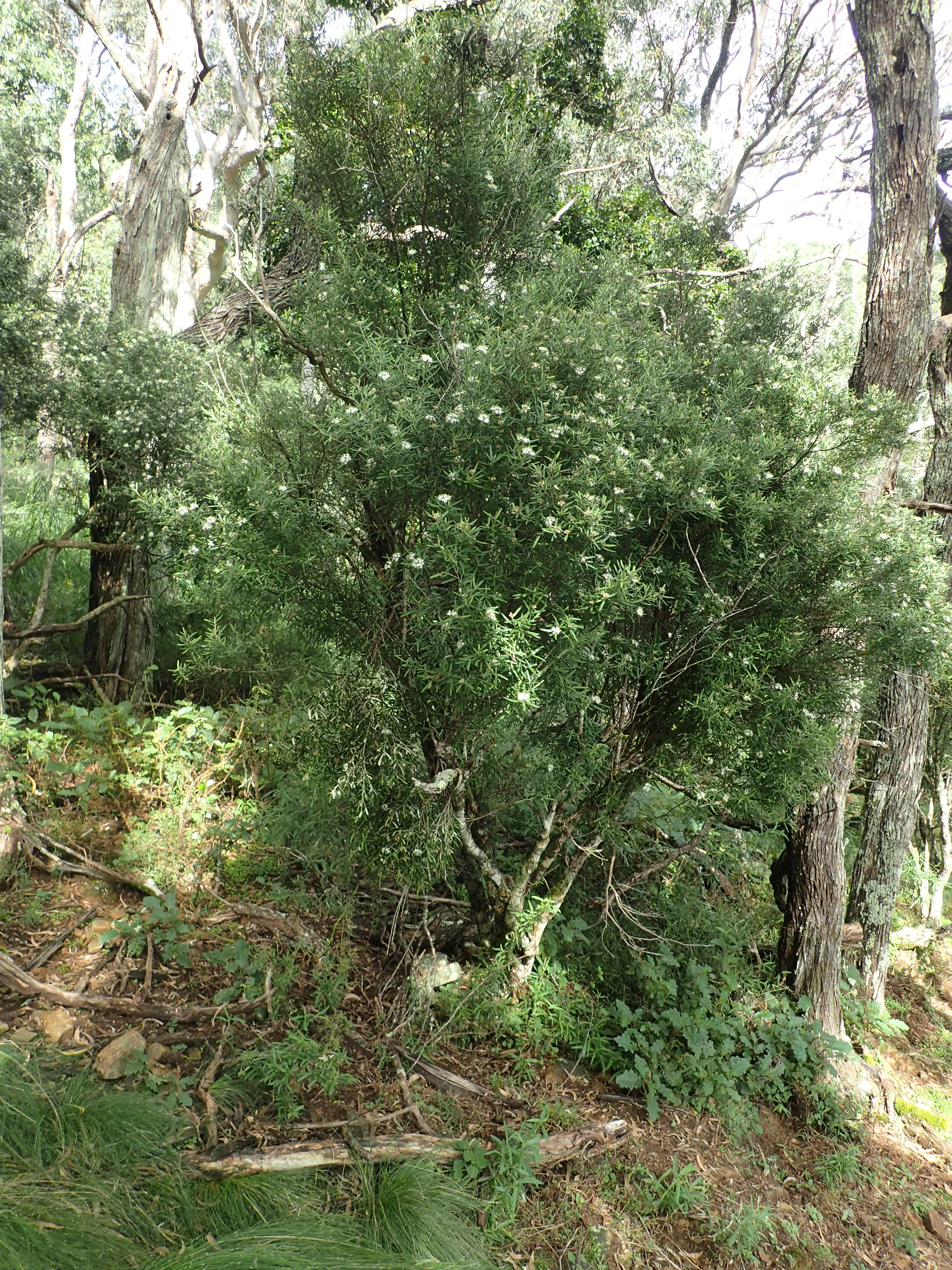
Habit in the Oxley Wild Rivers National Park

Phebalium verrucosum is a species of shrub that is endemic to New South Wales. It has branchlets densely covered with white scales, narrow elliptic, oblong or linear leaves covered with white scales on the lower side, and umbels of creamy white flowers with silvery or rust-coloured scales on the back of the petals.

== Description ==
Phebalium verrucosum is a shrub that typically grows to a height of 5 m (16 ft) and has branchlets covered with white scales. Its leaves are narrow elliptic, oblong or linear, 13–38 mm (0.51–1.50 in) long and 2–6 mm (0.079–0.236 in) wide on a petiole 1–2 mm (0.039–0.079 in) long. The upper surface of the leaves is warty and the lower surface is covered with silvery and rust-coloured scales. The flowers are arranged in umbels of mostly three to five flowers on the ends of branchlets, sometimes singly in adjacent leaf axils, each flower on a pedicel 2.5–6 mm (0.098–0.236 in) long and covered with star-shaped white hairs. The sepals are joined at the base to form a cup-shaped calyx 2 mm (0.079 in) wide, warty and covered with white, star-shaped hairs. The petals are creamy white and egg-shaped, 2.5–3 mm (0.098–0.118 in) long and about 1.5 mm (0.059 in) wide and with silvery or rust-coloured scales on the back. Flowering mainly occurs from September to November with sporadic flowering in April and June.

== Taxonomy and naming ==
This species was first formally described in 1970 by Paul Wilson who gave it the name Phebalium squamulosum subsp. verrucosum and published the description in the journal Nuytsia. In 2014, Ian Telford and Jeremy Bruhl raised it to species status as Phebalium verrucosum in the journal Telopea. The specific epithet (verrucosum) means "covered with warts".

== Distribution and habitat ==
Phebalium verrucosum grows in shrubby woodland and dry rainforest on the edge of gorges and rocky stream sides near the Macleay, Guy Fawkes and Nymboida rivers.
