= Wahlenbergia telfordii =

Scientific classification
- Kingdom: Plantae
- Clade: Tracheophytes
- Clade: Angiosperms
- Clade: Eudicots
- Clade: Asterids
- Order: Asterales
- Family: Campanulaceae
- Genus: Wahlenbergia
- Species: W. telfordii

Binomial name
- Wahlenbergia telfordii G.T.Plunkett & J.J.Bruhl

Species of flowering plant

Wahlenbergia telfordii is a herbaceous plant in the family Campanulaceae native to New South Wales.
