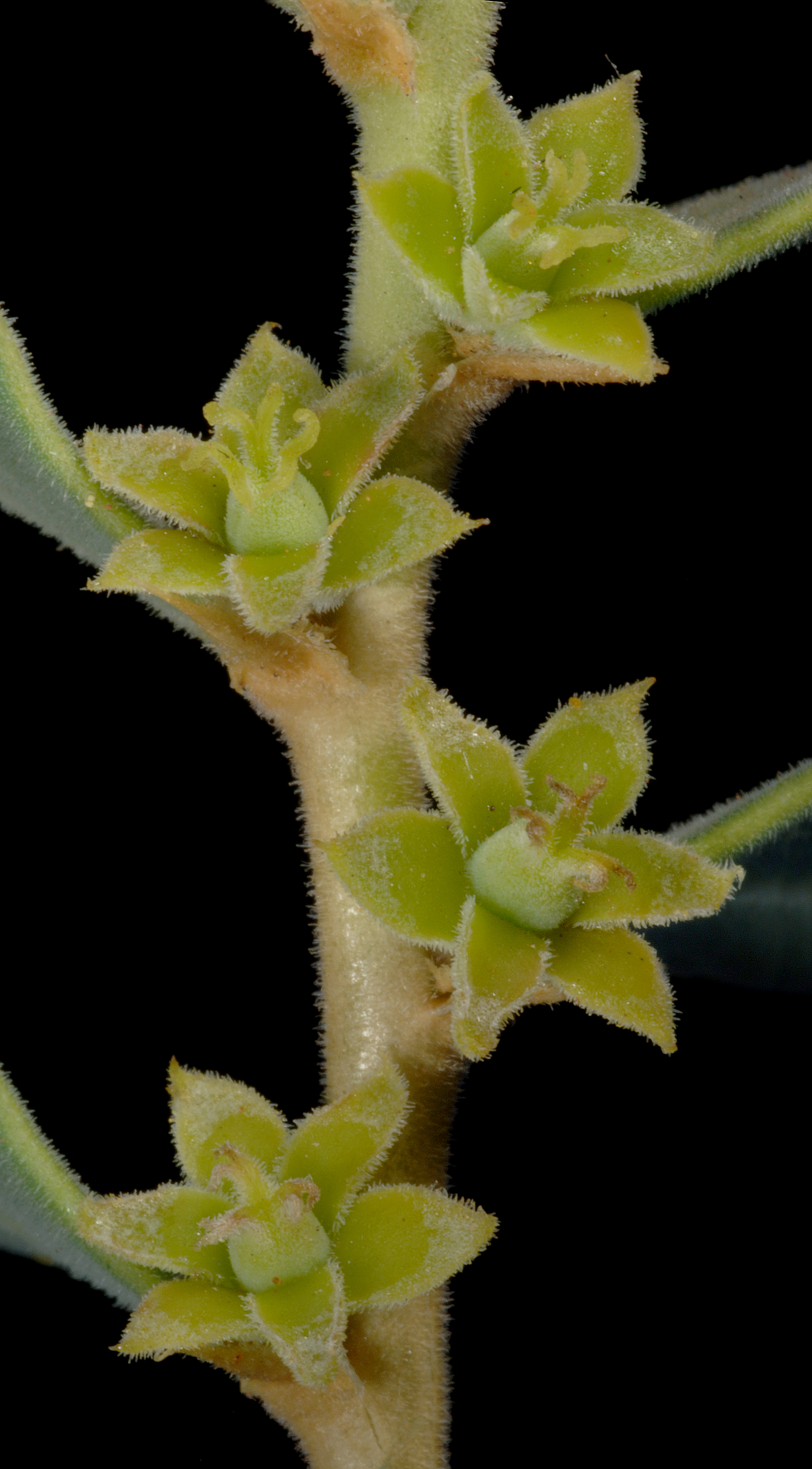

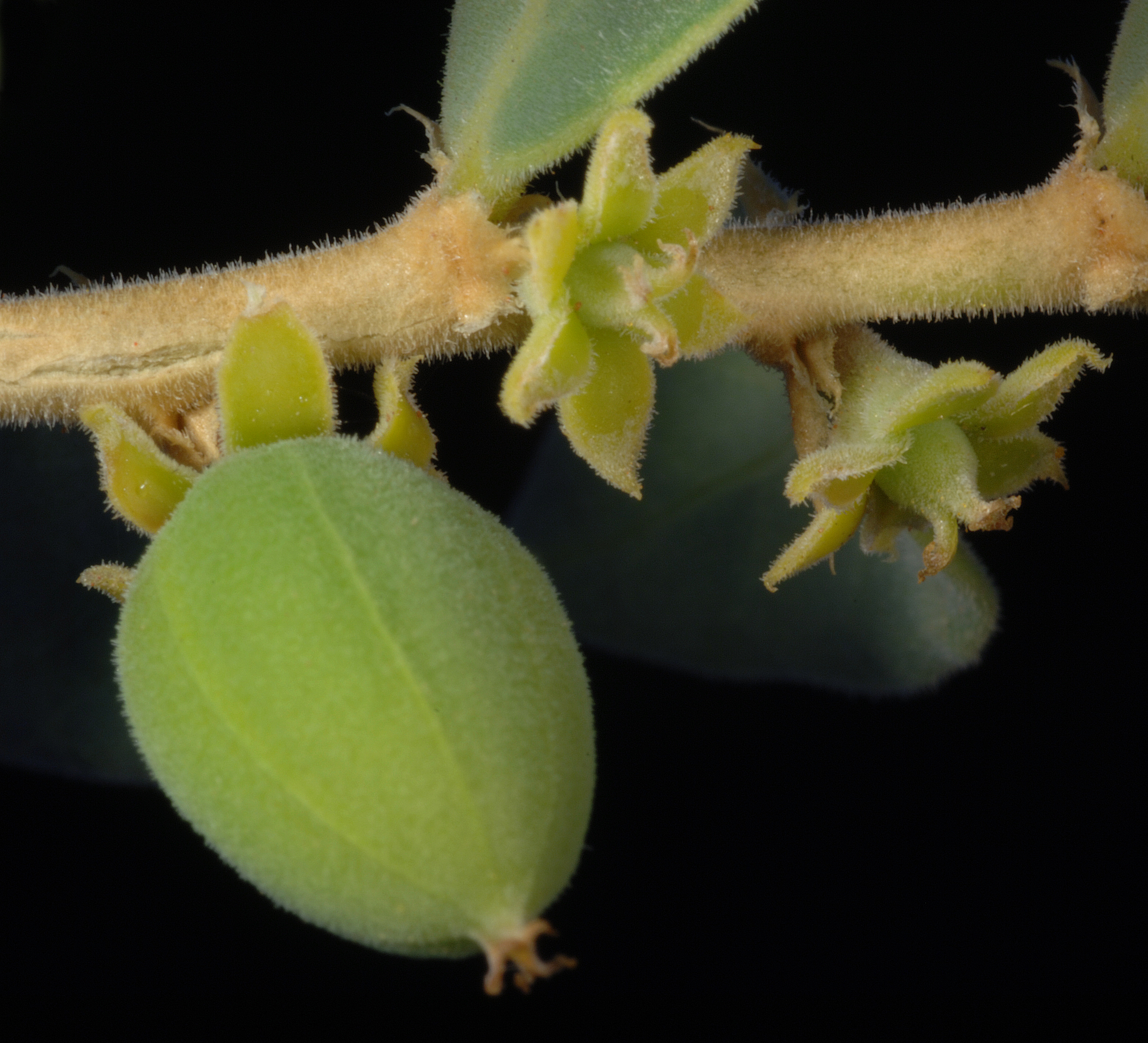

Conservation status
- Priority Three — Poorly Known Taxa (DEC)

Scientific classification
- Kingdom: Plantae
- Clade: Tracheophytes
- Clade: Angiosperms
- Clade: Eudicots
- Clade: Rosids
- Order: Malpighiales
- Family: Phyllanthaceae
- Genus: Synostemon
- Species: S. arenosus

Binomial name
- Synostemon arenosus (J.T.Hunter & J.J.Bruhl) I.Telford & J.J.Bruhl (2022)

Synonyms
- Sauropus arenosus J.T.Hunter & J.J.Bruhl (1997)

= Synostemon arenosus =

Species of shrub

Synostemon arenosus is a plant in the family Phyllanthaceae, native to Western Australia and the Northern Territory.

It is a spreading shrub growing from 0.5 to 1 m high. Its yellow-green/red-pink flowers may be seen in May.

== Distribution and habitat ==
In Western Australia it is found growing on red sand dunes in the IBRA regions of the Gibson Desert, the Great Sandy Desert, and the Little Sandy Desert.
