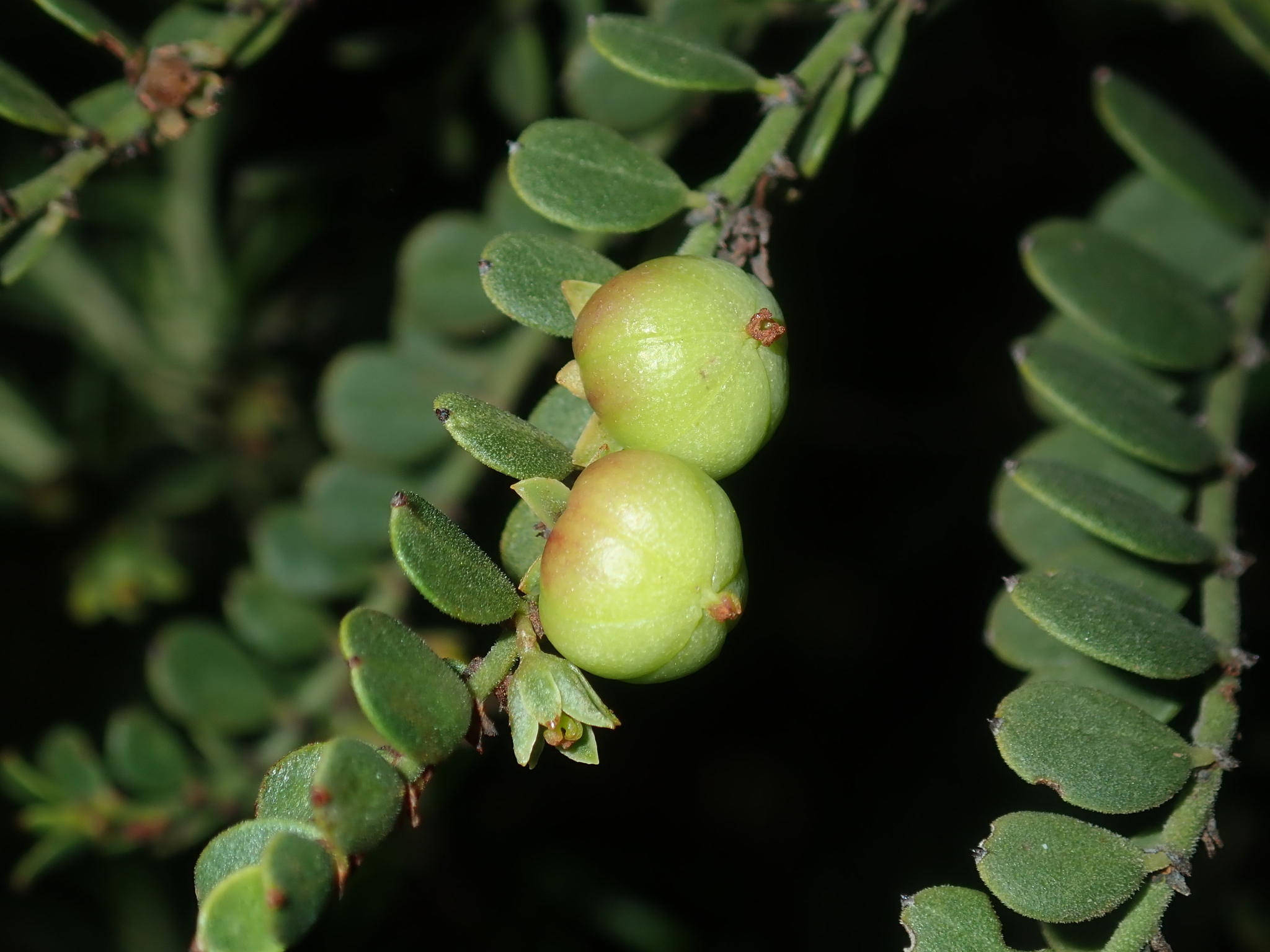
- Synostemon crassifolius

Scientific classification
- Kingdom: Plantae
- Clade: Tracheophytes
- Clade: Angiosperms
- Clade: Eudicots
- Clade: Rosids
- Order: Malpighiales
- Family: Phyllanthaceae
- Genus: Synostemon; F.Muell. (1858)

Species
- 36; see text

= Synostemon =

Genus of flowering plants

Synostemon is a genus of flowering plants in the family Phyllanthaceae. It includes 36 species which range from India through Indochina and south-eastern China to Malesia, New Guinea, and Australia.

== Species ==
36 species are accepted.

- Synostemon albiflorus (F.Muell. ex Müll.Arg.) Airy Shaw
- Synostemon anemoniflorus (J.T.Hunter & J.J.Bruhl) I.Telford & J.J.Bruhl
- Synostemon aphyllus (J.T.Hunter & J.J.Bruhl) I.Telford & Pruesapan
- Synostemon arenosus (J.T.Hunter & J.J.Bruhl) I.Telford & J.J.Bruhl
- Synostemon bacciformis (L.) G.L.Webster
- Synostemon cowiei I.Telford & J.J.Bruhl
- Synostemon crassifolius (Müll.Arg.) I.Telford & Pruesapan
- Synostemon ditassoides (Müll.Arg.) I.Telford & Pruesapan
- Synostemon dunlopii (J.T.Hunter & J.J.Bruhl) I.Telford & Pruesapan
- Synostemon elachophyllus (F.Muell. ex Benth.) I.Telford & Pruesapan
- Synostemon filicinus (J.T.Hunter & J.J.Bruhl) I.Telford & Pruesapan
- Synostemon glaucus F.Muell.
- Synostemon gracilis (J.T.Hunter & J.J.Bruhl) I.Telford & Pruesapan
- Synostemon hamersleyensis I.Telford & Naaykens
- Synostemon hirtellus F.Muell.
- Synostemon hubbardii (Airy Shaw) I.Telford & Pruesapan
- Synostemon inaequisepalus I.Telford & J.J.Bruhl
- Synostemon judithae I.Telford & J.J.Bruhl
- Synostemon kakadu I.Telford & J.J.Bruhl
- Synostemon lissocarpus (S.Moore) I.Telford & Pruesapan
- Synostemon nitmiluk I.Telford & J.J.Bruhl
- Synostemon ochrophyllus (Benth.) I.Telford & Pruesapan
- Synostemon paucifolius (J.T.Hunter & J.J.Bruhl) I.Telford & J.J.Bruhl
- Synostemon pinifolius (J.T.Hunter & J.J.Bruhl) I.Telford & Pruesapan
- Synostemon podenzanae (S.Moore) I.Telford & Pruesapan
- Synostemon ramosissimus F.Muell.
- Synostemon rhytidospermus (F.Muell. ex Müll.Arg.) I.Telford & Pruesapan
- Synostemon rigens F.Muell.
- Synostemon rigidulus (F.Muell. ex Müll.Arg.) I.Telford & Pruesapan
- Synostemon rimophilus (J.T.Hunter & J.J.Bruhl) I.Telford & Pruesapan
- Synostemon salignus (J.T.Hunter & J.J.Bruhl) I.Telford & Pruesapan
- Synostemon sphenophyllus Airy Shaw
- Synostemon spinosus I.Telford & J.J.Bruhl
- Synostemon stenocladus (Müll.Arg.) I.Telford & Pruesapan
- Synostemon trachyspermus (F.Muell.) I.Telford & Pruesapan
- Synostemon umbrosus I.Telford & J.J.Bruhl
