= Acacia vincentii =

Conservation status
- Priority One — Poorly Known Taxa (DEC)

Scientific classification
- Kingdom: Plantae
- Clade: Tracheophytes
- Clade: Angiosperms
- Clade: Eudicots
- Clade: Rosids
- Order: Fabales
- Family: Fabaceae
- Subfamily: Caesalpinioideae
- Clade: Mimosoid clade
- Genus: Acacia
- Species: A. vincentii

Binomial name
- Acacia vincentii R.S.Cowan & Maslin

Species of legume

Acacia vincentii is a shrub of the genus Acacia and the subgenus Plurinerves that is endemic to an area of north western Australia.

== Description ==
The shrub typically grows to a height of 3 metres (10 ft) and has long, arching branches with cylindrical and hairy branchlets that have persistent bristle-like stipules with a length of 2 to 2.5 mm (0.079 to 0.098 in). Like most species of Acacia it has phyllodes rather than true leaves. The ascending to erect, thinly leathery and evergreen phyllodes have an inequilaterally oblong-oblanceolate shape with rounded upper margin. The hairy phyllodes have a length of 4.5 to 5 mm (0.18 to 0.20 in) and a width of 1.5 to 2 mm (0.059 to 0.079 in) and two or three slightly raised nerves. It blooms in August and produces yellow flowers. The simple inflorescences occur singly in the axils and have obloid shaped flower-heads with a diameter of 5.5 mm (0.22 in) and contain 41 yellow coloured flowers. The hairy and crustaceous seed pods have a narrowly oblong shape and are curved with a length of up to 5.5 cm (2.2 in) and a width of 5 to 10 mm (0.20 to 0.39 in) and contain shiny black seeds.

== Distribution ==
It is native to an area in the Kimberley region of Western Australia where it is commonly situated on sandstone plateaux in shallow sandy soils. It has a limited range and is confined to the Edkins Range.

== See also ==
- List of Acacia species
