= Acacia froggattii =

Scientific classification
- Kingdom: Plantae
- Clade: Tracheophytes
- Clade: Angiosperms
- Clade: Eudicots
- Clade: Rosids
- Order: Fabales
- Family: Fabaceae
- Subfamily: Caesalpinioideae
- Clade: Mimosoid clade
- Genus: Acacia
- Species: A. froggattii

Binomial name
- Acacia froggattii Maiden
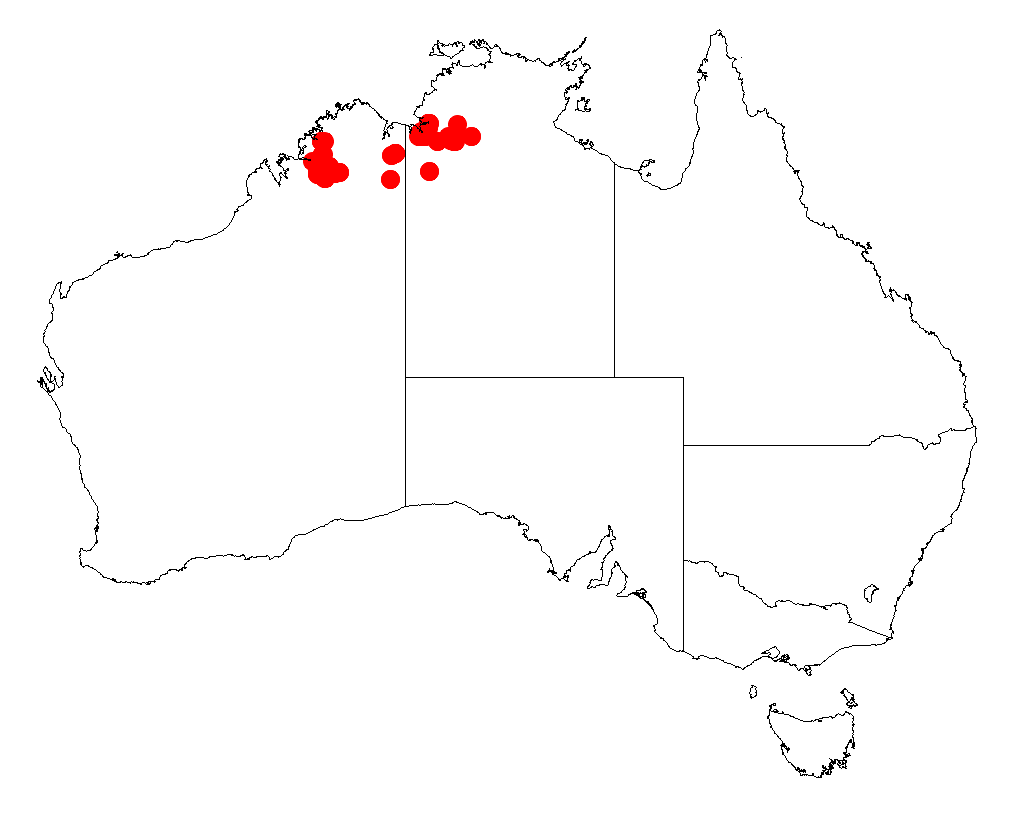
- Occurrence data from AVH

Synonyms
- Racosperma froggattii (Maiden) Pedley

Species of legume

Acacia froggattii is a species of flowering plant in the family Fabaceae and is endemic to the far north-west of Australia. It is a spreading, much-branched shrub with terete, hairy branchlets, crowded wedge-shaped, lance-shaped or elliptic phyllodes, spherical heads of yellow flowers and linear, leathery pods slightly raised over the seeds.

== Description ==
Acacia froggattii is a spreading, much-branched, sticky shrub that typically grows to a height of 0.4–1 m (1 ft 4 in – 3 ft 3 in) and has terete, hairy branchlets. Its phyllodes are crowded, ascending wedge-shaped, egg-shaped, lance-shaped or elliptic, more or less curved, 3.5–7 mm (0.14–0.28 in) long, 1.2–2.5 mm (0.047–0.098 in) wide and leathery with a more or less sharply pointed tip. There are needle-like stipules 1.0–1.5 mm (0.039–0.059 in) long at the base of the phyllodes. The flowers are borne in a spherical head in axils on a peduncle 9–17 mm (0.35–0.67 in) long, each head 4–6 mm (0.16–0.24 in) in diameter with 25 to 56 yellow flowers. Flowering occurs from July to November, and the pods are linear, curved, up to 40 mm (1.6 in) long, 4–5 mm (0.16–0.20 in) wide, leathery and hairy. The seeds are oblong, 6 mm (0.24 in) long and dull brown with an aril on the end.

== Taxonomy ==
Acacia froggattii was first formally described in 1920 by the botanist Joseph Maiden in the Journal and Proceedings of the Royal Society of New South Wales from specimens collected by William Vincent Fitzgerald in 1905, near Woollybutt Creek in the Phillip's Range in north-western Australia. The specific epithet (froggattii) honours Walter Wilson Froggatt.

== Distribution and habitat ==
This species of wattle grows in shallow soil over sandstone in shrubland and woodland in the Artesian Range, Isdell Range and Phillip's Range areas in the Kimberley is native to an area in the Northern Territory and the Kimberley region of Western Australia and the Fitzroy Range of the Northern Territory.

== Conservation status ==
Acacia froggattii is listed as "not threatened" by the Government of Western Australia Department of Biodiversity, Conservation and Attractions.

== See also ==
- List of Acacia species
