= Corymbia greeniana =

Scientific classification
- Kingdom: Plantae
- Clade: Tracheophytes
- Clade: Angiosperms
- Clade: Eudicots
- Clade: Rosids
- Order: Myrtales
- Family: Myrtaceae
- Genus: Corymbia
- Species: C. greeniana

Binomial name
- Corymbia greeniana (D.J.Carr & S.G.M.Carr) K.D.Hill & L.A.S.Johnson

Synonyms
- Synonyms: Corymbia byrnesii (D.J.Carr & S.G.M.Carr) K.D.Hill & L.A.S.Johnson; Corymbia curtipes (D.J.Carr & S.G.M.Carr) K.D.Hill & L.A.S.Johnson; Corymbia dampieri (D.J.Carr & S.G.M.Carr) K.D.Hill & L.A.S.Johnson; Eucalyptus blackwelliana D.J.Carr & S.G.M.Carr; Eucalyptus byrnesiana J.W.Green orth. var.; Eucalyptus byrnesii D.J.Carr & S.G.M.Carr; Eucalyptus curtipes D.J.Carr & S.G.M.Carr; Eucalyptus dampieri D.J.Carr & S.G.M.Carr; Eucalyptus durackiana D.J.Carr & S.G.M.Carr; Eucalyptus greeniana D.J.Carr & S.G.M.Carr; Eucalyptus pindanica L.A.S.Johnson & K.D.Hill MS

Species of plant

Corymbia greeniana is a species of tree that is endemic to northern Australia. It has rough bark on some or all of the trunk and larger branches, smooth bark above, broadly lance-shaped to egg-shaped adult leaves, flower buds usually in groups of seven, creamy white flowers and urn-shaped fruit with a distinct neck.

== Description ==
Corymbia greeniana is a tree that typically to a height of 10–15 m (33–49 ft) and forms a lignotuber. It has rough, loose, flaky, tessellated brownish bark on some or all of the trunk, sometimes also on the larger branches, smooth white and pale grey bark above. Young plants and coppice regrowth have dull green, more or less round to broadly egg-shaped leaves that are 100–260 mm (3.9–10.2 in) long, 35–180 mm (1.4–7.1 in) wide and petiolate. Adult leaves are more or less the same shade of green on both sides, broadly lance-shaped to egg-shaped, 80–230 mm (3.1–9.1 in) long and 20–76 mm (0.79–2.99 in) wide on a petiole 11–56 mm (0.43–2.20 in) long. The flower buds are arranged on the ends of branchlets on a branched peduncle 4–28 mm (0.16–1.10 in) long, each branch of the peduncle with seven, sometimes nine buds, on pedicels 2–18 mm (0.079–0.709 in) long. Mature buds are oval to pear-shaped, 8–10 mm (0.31–0.39 in) long and 6–8 mm (0.24–0.31 in) wide with a rounded operculum that has a small point in the centre. Flowering occurs from January to May and the flowers are creamy white. The fruit is a woody urn-shaped capsule 13–28 mm (0.51–1.10 in) long and 11–22 mm (0.43–0.87 in) wide with a short vertical neck and the valves enclosed in the fruit.

== Taxonomy and naming ==
This eucalypt was first formally described in 1987 by Denis Carr and Stella Carr and was given the name Eucalyptus greeniana. In 1995 Ken Hill and Lawrie Johnson changed the name to Corymbia greeniana. The specific epithet (greeniana) honours Marjorie Free (née Marjorie Green), an herbarium curator.

== Distribution and habitat ==
Corymbia greeniana grows on red and yellow sand soils, sometimes on basalt or volcanic rocks in open savannah woodland. It occurs in the Kimberley, Western Australia region of Western Australia and east through the Top End between Katherine and Mataranke in the Northern Territory to Doomadgee and scattered areas of the southern Cape York Peninsula in Queensland.
