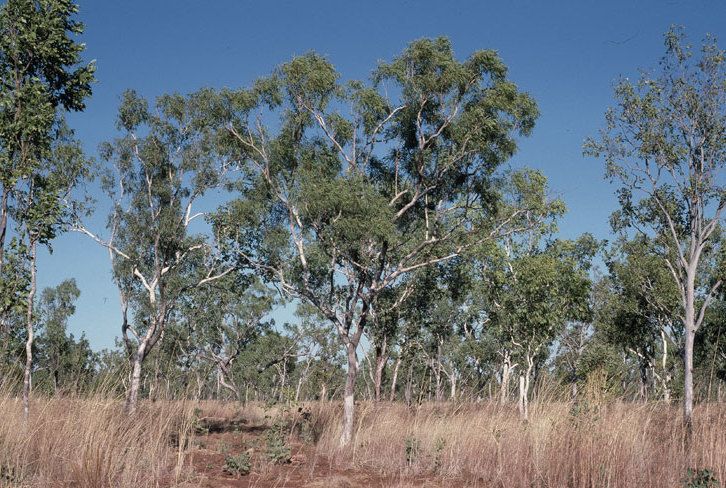
- Eucalyptus tectifica near the Gibb River

Scientific classification
- Kingdom: Plantae
- Clade: Tracheophytes
- Clade: Angiosperms
- Clade: Eudicots
- Clade: Rosids
- Order: Myrtales
- Family: Myrtaceae
- Genus: Eucalyptus
- Species: E. tectifica

Binomial name
- Eucalyptus tectifica F.Muell.

Synonyms
- Eucalyptus spencerana J.W.Green orth. var.; Eucalyptus spenceriana Maiden

= Eucalyptus tectifica =

Darwin box

Species of eucalyptus

Eucalyptus tectifica, commonly known as Darwin box, or grey box, is a species of tree that is endemic to northern Australia. It has rough, fibrous or flaky bark on the trunk and branches, lance-shaped or curved adult leaves, flower buds usually in groups of seven, creamy white flowers and conical, cup-shaped or barrel-shaped fruit.

== Description ==
Eucalyptus tectifica is a tree that typically grows to a height of 15 m (49 ft) and forms a lignotuber. It has rough, fibrous or flaky greyish bark on the trunk and branches. The tree is deciduous or partly deciduous during the dry season. Young plants and coppice regrowth have egg-shaped to broadly lance-shaped leaves that are 90–180 mm (3.5–7.1 in) long and 65–90 mm (2.6–3.5 in) wide and petiolate. Adult leaves are the same shade of green on both sides, lance-shaped or curved, 90–225 mm (3.5–8.9 in) long and 9–30 mm (0.35–1.18 in) wide, tapering to a petiole 7–30 mm (0.28–1.18 in) long. The flower buds are arranged on the ends of branchlets, usually in groups of seven, on a thin branching peduncle 4–15 mm (0.16–0.59 in) long, the individual buds on pedicels 1–8 mm (0.039–0.315 in) long. Mature buds are oval to pear-shaped, 4–7 mm (0.16–0.28 in) long and 3–5 mm (0.12–0.20 in) wide with a beaked operculum. Flowering occurs from October to December and the flowers are creamy white. The fruit is a woody conical, cup-shaped or barrel-shaped capsule 3–8 mm (0.12–0.31 in) long and 4–8 mm (0.16–0.31 in) wide with the valves near rim level.

== Taxonomy and naming ==
Eucalyptus tectifica was first formally described by the botanist Ferdinand von Mueller in 1859 in Journal of the Proceedings of the Linnean Society, Botany. The specific epithet (tectifica) is from Latin words meaning "a roof" and "to make", indicating the use of the bark by Aboriginal people to make shelters.

== Distribution and habitat ==
Darwin box occurs across northern Australia from near Broome in Western Australia to Darwin in the Northern Territory, then as far east as near Normanton in Queensland and on some islands in the Gulf of Carpentaria. It is found on hillsides and along creeks in woodland, where it grows in skeletal sandy alluvium over quartzite, sandstone or basalt.

== Conservation status ==
This eucalypt is classified as "not threatened" by the Western Australian Government Department of Parks and Wildlife, as "least concern" under the Northern Territory Government Territory Parks and Wildlife Conservation Act 2000 and as "least concern" under the Queensland Government Nature Conservation Act 1992.

== See also ==
- List of Eucalyptus species
