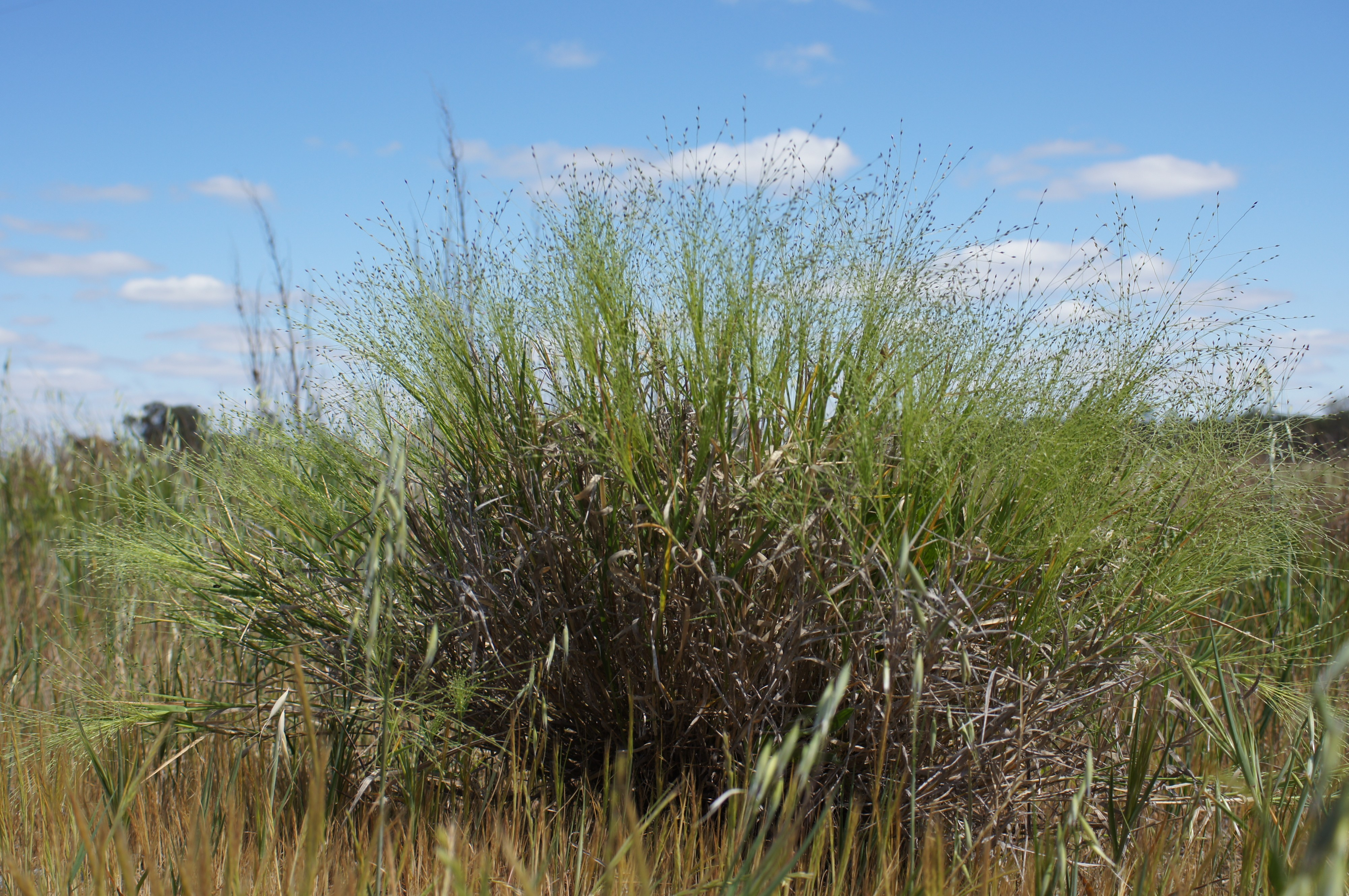

Scientific classification
- Kingdom: Plantae
- Clade: Tracheophytes
- Clade: Angiosperms
- Clade: Monocots
- Clade: Commelinids
- Order: Poales
- Family: Poaceae
- Genus: Walwhalleya; Wills & J.J.Bruhl

Synonyms
- Whalleya Wills & J.J.Bruhl

= Walwhalleya =

Genus of flowering plants

Walwhalleya is a genus of flowering plants belonging to the family Poaceae, subfamily Panicoideae and the tribe Paniceae. All members use C3 photosynthesis

It is native to the states of New South Wales, Queensland, South Australia and Victoria in Australia.

== Known species ==
As accepted by Kew:

- Walwhalleya jacobsiana R.D.B.Whalley & J.J.Bruhl
- Walwhalleya proluta (F.Muell.) Wills & J.J.Bruhl
- Walwhalleya pungens (Wills & J.J.Bruhl) Wills & J.J.Bruhl
- Walwhalleya subxerophila (Domin) Wills & J.J.Bruhl

== Taxonomy ==
The genus name of Walwhalleya is in honour of Ralph Derwyn Broughton Whalley (b. 1933), an Australian botanist and specialist in grasses. It was first described and published in Austral. Syst. Bot. Vol.19 on page 327 in 2006.
