= Matthew David Barrett =

Australian botanist

- Occupation: Botanist

Matthew David Barrett (born 1974) is a West Australian botanist. He has published some 100 botanical names. See also Taxa named by Matthew David Barrett. He worked at Kings Park and Botanic Garden and is currently (July 2020) employed by the University of Western Australia.

== Some publications ==
- Phillips, Ryan D.; Barrett, Matthew D.; Dixon, Kingsley W.; Hopper, Stephen D. (2011). "Do mycorrhizal symbioses cause rarity in orchids?". Journal of Ecology. 99 (3): 858–869. doi:10.1111/j.1365-2745.2011.01797.x. ISSN 0022-0477. S2CID 82291866.
- Saarela, Jeffery M.; Burke, Sean V.; Wysocki, William P.; Barrett, Matthew D.; Clark, Lynn G.; Craine, Joseph M.; Peterson, Paul M.; Soreng, Robert J.; Vorontsova, Maria S.; Duvall, Melvin R. (2018). "A 250 plastome phylogeny of the grass family (Poaceae): topological support under different data partitions". PeerJ. 6 e4299. doi:10.7717/peerj.4299. ISSN 2167-8359. PMC 5798404. PMID 29416954.
- Cusimano, Natalie; Barrett, Matthew D.; Hetterscheid, Wilbert L.A.; Renner, Susanne S. (2010). "A phylogeny of the Areae (Araceae) implies that Typhonium, Sauromatum, and the Australian species of Typhonium are distinct clades". Taxon. 59 (2): 439–447. doi:10.1002/tax.592009. ISSN 0040-0262.
- Hay, A.; Barrett, M.D.; Barrett, R.L. (1999). "A new species of Typhonium (Araceae: Areae) from the West Kimberley, Western Australia". Nuytsia. 13 (1): 143–245.
