= Jeremy James Bruhl =

Australian botanist

- Born: 1956 (age 69–70); Sydney
- Scientific career
- Fields: Botany
- Institutions: University of New England
- Author abbrev. (botany): J.J.Bruhl

Jeremy James Bruhl (born 1956) is an Australian botanist. He is an emeritus professor in the School of Environmental and Rural Science at the University of New England and director of the N.C.W. Beadle Herbarium which holds c.110,000 plant specimens.

He has written on many species, in particular, on the genera Phyllanthus, Sauropus and Walwhalleya, and also extensively on the family Cyperaceae (see below).

Some published names

Eucalyptus oresbia Eucalyptus quinniorum Gingidia rupicola Lepidosperma monticola Phebalium verrucosum Phyllanthus baeckeoides Phyllanthus cauticola Phyllanthus erwinii Phyllanthus involutus Phyllanthus oblanceolatus Phyllanthus occidentalis Phyllanthus prominulatus Phyllanthus striaticaulis Phyllanthus sulcatus Sauropus anemoniflorus Sauropus aphyllus Sauropus arenosus Sauropus convallarioides Sauropus decrescentifolia Sauropus dunlopii Sauropus filicinus	Sauropus gracilis Sauropus paucifolius Sauropus rimophilus Sauropus salignus Sauropus stenocladus Sauropus torridus Wahlenbergia rupicola Wahlenbergia telfordii Walwhalleya; Walwhalleya jacobsiana Walwhalleya proluta Walwhalleya pungens Walwhalleya subxerophila

== Some publications ==
- 2000. Multiple evolutionary origins of C4 photosynthesis in the Cyperaceae : 629-636. In: K.L. Wilson & D.A. Morrison (eds.) Monocots: Systematics and Evolution. CSIRO Publ. Collinwood. Australia
- 1990. Cypsela Anatomy in the 'Cotuleae' (Asteraceae-Anthemideae) . With Christopher J. Quinn. Ed. Academic Press, 23 pp.
- 1987. (with Whalley R.D.B.) Systematic studies in Paniceae (Poaceae): Homopholis and Whalleya, The Australian Paniceae (Poaceae) 96, Australian Systematic Botany 13 (3): 437-468
- 2011. (with Whalley, R.D.B.) Walwhalleya jacobsiana (Poaceae, Paniceae), a new, rare species of grass from South Australia. Telopea 13, 77-92.
- 2007. (with Wilson, K.L.) "Towards a comprehensive survey of C3 and C4 photosynthetic pathways in Cyperaceae. Aliso: A Journal of Systematic and Evolutionary Botany 23, 99-148".
- 2006. (with Wilson, P.G., Wills, K.E.) Grass not fungus: Walwhalleya nom. nov. (Poaceae, Paniceae). Australian Systematic Botany 19, 327-328.doi:10.1071/SB06004
- 1997. (with Hunter, J.T.) New Sauropus (Euphorbiaceae: Phyllantheae) taxa for the Northern Territory and Western Australia and notes on other Sauropus occurring in these regions. Nuytsia 11, 165-184.
- 1997. (with Hunter, J.T.) Two new species of Phyllanthus and notes on Phyllanthus and Sauropus (Euphorbiaceae: Phyllantheae) in New South Wales. Telopea 7, 149-165.
- 2008. (with Pruesapan, K., Telford, I.R.H., Draisma, S.G.A., Van Welzen, P.C.) Delimitation of Sauropus (Phyllanthaceae) Based on Plastid matK and Nuclear Ribosomal ITS DNA Sequence Data. Annals of Botany 102, 1007-1018.doi:10.1093/aob/mcn193
- 2015. (with Rye, B.L., Barrett, R.L., Barrett, M.D., Clarke, K.L., Wilson, K.L.) Five new species and a new combination in Cyperaceae from the Kimberley region of Western Australia. Nuytsia 26, 167-184.
- 2017. (with Telford, I.R.) Three new species segregated from Phebalium squamulosum (Rutaceae) based on morphological and phytochemical data. Telopea in preparation,
- 2004. (with Xiufu, Z., Wilson, K.L.) Sympodial Structure of Spikelets in the Tribe Schoeneae (Cyperaceae). American Journal of Botany 91, 24-36.
