= Russell Lindsay Barrett =

Australian botanist, ecologist and reearcher (1977 - )

- Born: 1977 (age 48–49)
- Scientific career
- Fields: Botany
- Institutions: National Herbarium of New South Wales
- Author abbrev. (botany): R.L.Barrett
- Website: https://www.theplantpress.com/

Russell Lindsay Barrett (born 1977) is an Australian botanist.

The standard author abbreviation R.L.Barrett is used to indicate this person as the author when citing a botanical name.

== Names published ==
(incomplete list of the 129 published names)

- Typhonium peltandroides Nuytsia, 13(1): 243 (1999)
- Gahnia halmaturina R.L.Barrett & K.L.Wilson Journal Adelaide Botanical Garden (2012)
- Acacia anastomosa Maslin, M.D.Barrett & R.L.Barrett, Nuytsia 23: 545 (2013).
- Anthelepis R.L.Barrett, K.L.Wilson & J.J.Bruhl, Austral. Syst. Bot. 32(4): 276 (2019).

(These may not be accepted names.)

== Publications ==
(incomplete)

- Viljoen, J.-A.; Muasya, A.M.; Barrett, R.L.; Bruhl, J.J.; Gibbs, A.K.; Slingsby, J.A.; Wilson, K.L.; Verboom, G.A. (2013). "Radiation and repeated transoceanic dispersal of Schoeneae (Cyperaceae) through the southern hemisphere". American Journal of Botany. 100 (12): 2494–2508. doi:10.3732/ajb.1300105. ISSN 0002-9122. PMID 24302693.
- Barrett, R.L.; Wilson, K.L. (2012). "A review of the genus Lepidosperma Labill. (Cyperaceae: Schoeneae)". Australian Systematic Botany. 25 (4): 225. doi:10.1071/SB11037. ISSN 1030-1887. S2CID 83770459.
- Liu, B.; Le, C.T.; Barrett, R.L.; Nickrent, D.L.; Chen, Z.; Lu, L.; Vidal-Russell, R. (2018). "Historical biogeography of Loranthaceae (Santalales): Diversification agrees with emergence of tropical forests and radiation of songbirds". Molecular Phylogenetics and Evolution. 124: 199–212. doi:10.1016/j.ympev.2018.03.010. hdl:11336/90592. ISSN 1055-7903. PMID 29550535. S2CID 4855752.

== See also ==
- https://www.theplantpress.com/
