= Karen Louise Wilson =

Australian botanist

- Born: 1950 (age 75–76)
- Education: University of New South Wales
- Scientific career
- Fields: Botany
- Workplaces: National Herbarium of New South Wales
- Thesis: Systematic studies in Cyperus section Pinnati (1986)
- Author abbrev. (botany): K.L.Wilson

Karen Louise Wilson AM (born 1950) is an Australian botanist.

== Career ==
Some of her research interests are: systematics, phylogenetic and biogeographic studies on Cyperaceae, Casuarinaceae, Juncaceae and Polygonaceae. Other professional interests include botanical nomenclature; botanical history, biodiversity, informatics and scientific editing.

From 1973 to the present (As of 17 September 2018) she has worked at the Royal Botanic Gardens, National Herbarium of New South Wales, Australia. Wilson graduated from the University of New South Wales with an MSc in 1986.

The standard author abbreviation K.L.Wilson is used to indicate this person as the author when citing a botanical name.

== Names published ==
She has published at least 105 species names according to APNI, while IPNI records some 107.

- Gymnanthera fruticosa K.L.Wilson (Gymnanthera cunninghamii) J. Adelaide Bot. Gard. 10(1): 113 (1987).
- Rhyncharrhena linearis (Decne.) K.L.Wilson, Telopea 2(1): 38 (1980) (now Vincetoxicum lineare)
- Baumea johnsonii K.L.Wilson, Telopea 1(6): 457 (1980).

(incomplete)

== Publications ==
(incomplete)

=== Journal articles ===
- Plunkett, George; Wilson, Karen; Bruhl, Jeremy (2013). "Sedges in the mist: A new species of Lepidosperma (Cyperaceae, Schoeneae) from the mountains of Tasmania". PhytoKeys (28): 19–59. Bibcode:2013PhytK..28...19P. doi:10.3897/phytokeys.28.5592. ISSN 1314-2003. PMC 3881413. PMID 24399891.
- Rye, B.L., Barrett, R.L., Barrett, M.D., Bruhl, J.J., Clarke, K.L., Wilson, K.L. (2015) Five new species and a new combination in Cyperaceae from the Kimberley region of Western Australia. Nuytsia 26: 167-184.ISSN 0085-4417 PDF.
- Larridon, Isabel; Bauters, Kenneth; Semmouri, Ilias; Viljoen, Jan-Adriaan; Prychid, Christina J.; Muasya, A. Muthama; Bruhl, Jeremy J.; Wilson, Karen L.; Senterre, Bruno; Goetghebeur, Paul (2018). "Molecular phylogenetics of the genus Costularia (Schoeneae, Cyperaceae) reveals multiple distinct evolutionary lineages". Molecular Phylogenetics and Evolution. 126: 196–209. Bibcode:2018MolPE.126..196L. doi:10.1016/j.ympev.2018.04.016. ISSN 1055-7903. PMID 29679713. S2CID 5028867.
- Thomson, S.A. et.al. (2018) Thomson, Scott A.; Pyle, Richard L.; Ahyong, Shane T.; Alonso-Zarazaga, Miguel; Ammirati, Joe; Araya, Juan Francisco; Ascher, John S.; Audisio, Tracy Lynn; Azevedo-Santos, Valter M.; Bailly, Nicolas; Baker, William J.; Balke, Michael; Barclay, Maxwell V. L.; Barrett, Russell L.; Benine, Ricardo C.; Bickerstaff, James R. M.; Bouchard, Patrice; Bour, Roger; Bourgoin, Thierry; Boyko, Christopher B.; Breure, Abraham S. H.; Brothers, Denis J.; Byng, James W.; Campbell, David; Ceríaco, Luis M. P.; Cernák, István; Cerretti, Pierfilippo; Chang, Chih-Han; Cho, Soowon; et al. (2018). "Taxonomy based on science is necessary for global conservation". PLOS Biology. 16 (3) e2005075. doi:10.1371/journal.pbio.2005075. ISSN 1545-7885. PMC 5851535. PMID 29538381.
- Musili, Paul M.; Bruhl, Jeremy J.; Wilson, Karen L. (2018). "Schoenus rupicola: a narrowly endemic species distinguished from S. melanostachys (Cyperaceae, Schoeneae) in eastern Australia". Australian Systematic Botany. 31 (3): 219. Bibcode:2018AuSyB..31..219M. doi:10.1071/SB17046. ISSN 1030-1887. S2CID 90196364.
- Musili, Paul M.; Gibbs, Adele K.; Wilson, Karen L.; Bruhl, Jeremy J. (2016). "Schoenus (Cyperaceae) is not monophyletic based on ITS nrDNA sequence data". Australian Systematic Botany. 29 (5): 265. Bibcode:2016AuSyB..29..265M. doi:10.1071/SB15046. ISSN 1030-1887. S2CID 89582913.
- Duke, Colin C.; Tran, Van H.; Duke, Rujee K.; Abu-Mellal, Abdallah; Plunkett, George T.; King, Douglas I.; Hamid, Kaiser; Wilson, Karen L.; Barrett, Russell L.; Bruhl, Jeremy J. (2017). "A sedge plant as the source of Kangaroo Island propolis rich in prenylated p-coumarate ester and stilbenes". Phytochemistry. 134: 87–97. Bibcode:2017PChem.134...87D. doi:10.1016/j.phytochem.2016.11.005. ISSN 0031-9422. PMID 27890584.
- Jiménez-Mejías, Pedro; Luceño, Modesto; Wilson, Karen L.; Waterway, Marcia J.; Roalson, Eric H. (2016). "Clarification of the Use of the Terms Perigynium and Utricle in Carex L. (Cyperaceae)". Systematic Botany. 41 (3): 519–528. Bibcode:2016SysBo..41..519J. doi:10.1600/036364416X692488. ISSN 0363-6445. S2CID 89281001.

=== Books ===
Karen L. Wilson and David A. Morrison (eds.) (1998) (1998) Monocots : systematics and evolution

== Honours ==
In 2008, she received an AM (member of the Order of Australia) in the Queen's Birthday Honours for services to botany as a researcher and for the recording and documentation of Australian biodiversity. The citation lists the following achievements and services:

Period	Position
present	Acting Manager, Plant Diversity Section, Botanic Gardens Trust, Sydney
1973 -	Botanist/Special Botanist
1986 - 1993	Scientific editor, Telopea scientific journal
1992 - 1995	Scientific representative, Committee, Friends of the Gardens
1992 -	Member, Friends' Publication Committee
2002 -	Adjunct Associate Professor, University of New England
1994 - 1996	President, Linnean Society of NSW
1997 - 2008	Vice-President, Linnean Society of NSW
1984 -	Council Member, Linnean Society of NSW
1990 - 2000	Chair, Joyce W Vickery Research Fund Committee
1993 - 1999	Member, Editorial Advisory Committee, Flora of Australia
2005 -	Member, Scientific Advisory Board, Australian Systematic Botany journal
1975 - 1979	Secretary, Australian Systematic Botany Society
1979 - 1980	Councillor, Australian Systematic Botany Society
2008	Member, new Committee for Data in Science, Australian Academy of Science
1980 -	Author/Co-Author of a range of scientific publications,(mainly on sedges, rushes, she-oaks and smartweeds)
	Director, Species 2000 'Catalogue of Life' Program
2004 - 2006	Chair, Global Team, Species 2000 'Catalogue of Life'
1997-	Member, Global Team, Species 2000 'Catalogue of Life'
2001 - 2007	Chair, Taxonomy Group
1999 -	Member, Species 2000, Asia-Oceania Working Group

In addition she was a member of the organising committees for regional workshops on Global Taxonomy Initiative of Convention on Biological Diversity, a convenor of the Committee on Electronic Publishing and Databasing, International Association for Plant Taxonomy (1993-2005), a convenor of the International Conference on 'Comparative Biology of the Monocotyledons', Sydney (1998) co-editing the proceedings, and more.

== See also ==
Taxa named by Karen Louise Wilson
