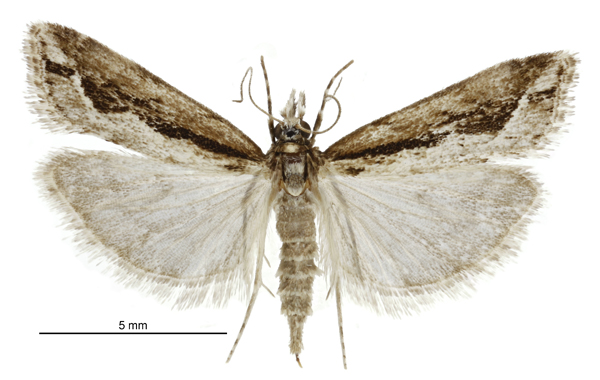
- Female
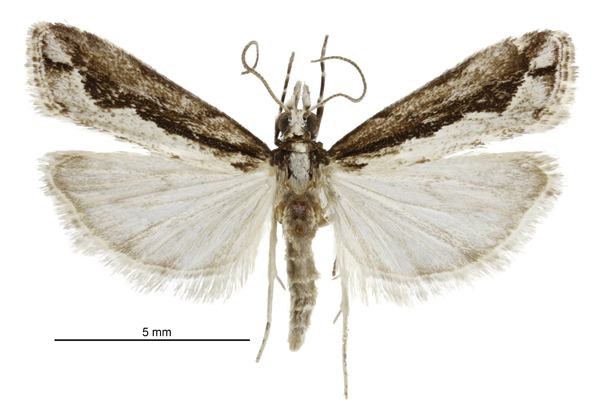
- Male

Scientific classification
- Kingdom: Animalia
- Phylum: Arthropoda
- Class: Insecta
- Order: Lepidoptera
- Family: Crambidae
- Genus: Eudonia
- Species: E. steropaea

Binomial name
- Eudonia steropaea (Meyrick, 1884)

Synonyms
- Scoparia steropaea Meyrick, 1884

= Eudonia steropaea =

Species of moth

Eudonia steropaea is a species of moth of the family Crambidae. It was named by Edward Meyrick in 1884. Meyrick gave a detailed description of this species in 1885. It is endemic to New Zealand.

The wingspan is 13–16 mm. The forewings are pale fuscous, irrorated with darker. There is a small blackish spot at the base of the inner margin and a straight black streak from the base to somewhat before the middle of the disc, almost meeting a triangular blackish blotch. The first line is indicated by an angulated darker posterior margin. The second line is white. The hindwings are grey-whitish, the hindmargin somewhat suffused with darker. Adults have been recorded on wing in January.

== Hosts ==
It has been hypothesised that the hosts of this moth are species in the moss genus Campylopus including Campylopus introflexus.
