= Leucobryum candidum =

Scientific classification
- Kingdom: Plantae
- Division: Bryophyta
- Class: Bryopsida
- Subclass: Dicranidae
- Order: Dicranales
- Family: Leucobryaceae
- Genus: Leucobryum
- Species: L. candidum

Binomial name
- Leucobryum candidum Hampe
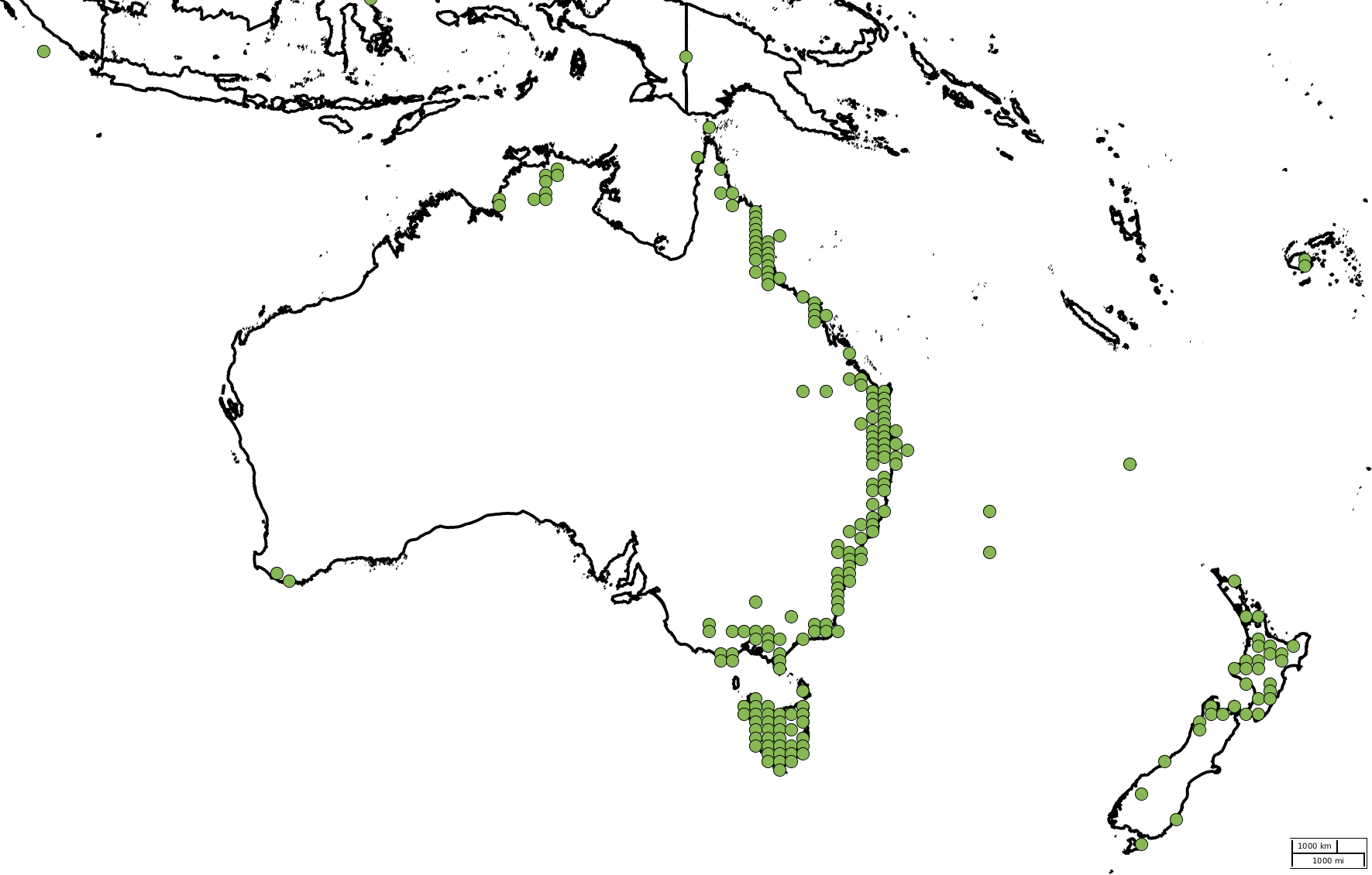
- Distribution of L. candidum across Australia

Species of plant

Leucobryum candidum, commonly known as milk moss, is a species of moss that occurs throughout Tasmania, Australia, and other parts of the world. It is the sole species representative of Leucobryum in Tasmania, despite the genus being widespread throughout other cool temperate regions.

== Description ==
Leucobryum candidum ranges in colour from pale green to whitish green, growing in turfs or mats that appear glaucous.

The leaf blades (lamina) are narrow (4.5-6.0mm long, 0.8-1.4mm wide) and curved, very pale; almost blue-white when dry. This colour is caused by a leaf composition of 4-6 layers of large hyaline cells surrounded by layers of pores (leucocysts) and embedded chlorophyllose cells (chlorocysts); 1-3 layers adaxially, 2-3 abaxially. The leaves of L. candidum overlap each other and are arranged spirally along the stems. The lamina are almost entirely occupied by the central vein (costa), and are not auriculate as the base is slightly narrowed. Leaves located towards the base of the moss are shorter and narrower than the adjacent stem leaves.

The stems of this moss lack a central stand, appearing red-brown with rhizoids extending from the base of erect branches and stems.

The stalk (seta) of the sporophyte is long (9-15mm), smooth, red-brown, and twisted in a clockwise direction. The spore capsule is inclined horizontally, curved (1.2-1.5mm long), yellow-brown, appears grooved (sulcate) when dried out. The operculum cap is beak-like (rostrate) with a conical base (1.2-1.5mm long).

In the field, this species can be most efficiently recognised by the whitish appearance of the mats, easily identifiable by the slightly curved leaves which are U-shaped in cross section).

== Phylogeny ==
Leucobryaceae are characterised by whitish leaves with thick, expanded costa and narrow basal lamina. Their pale appearance is likely caused by air bubbles in the leucocysts. These are considered necessary for chlorocyst function and gaseous exchange. The members of this family are often included in Dicranaceae , as they share similar structures; the leaf form, capsule shape, and peristome substructure of Leucobryum genus in particular seems to derive from a Campylopus-type member of the Dicranaceae . These mosses are haplolepideous, as the peristome that surrounds the capsule is uniquely characterised by the absence of a median line and teeth that alternate in a 2:3 pattern. Four stages have been noted in the functional evolution of Leucobryaceae:

1. the stratification of the leaf into leucocyst and chlorocyst layers;
2. a shift from soil substrates to dead wood substrates or growing on other plants (epiphytism);
3. an increasing reliance on vegetative reproduction over sporophytes; and
4. morphogenetic increase in chlorocyst numbers.

Leucobryum is widespread across all continents excluding Antarctica. While the genus includes approximately 80 species, only four (and additional one variety) inhabit Australia. The important diagnostic features of Australian species include:

i. presence/absence of central strand in the stem;
ii. the shape of the leaf base (eg. decurrent, auriculate etc.);
iii. ornamentation of the abaxial leucocysts in the upper part of the leaves;
iv. number of layers of adaxial and abaxial leucocysts at base of the leaves; and
v. size and shape of the superficial abaxial leucocysts at the base of the leaves.

DNA sequencing has suggested that Leucobryum candidum is closely related to two other species, L. aduncum and L. javense. The species is commonly confused with the later, and has previously been treated as a synonym for the Malesian L. javense. This grouping was rejected however, excluding L. candidum from Malesian bryoflora as DNA evidence indicated that they are two distinctly different species.

== Distribution and habitat ==
Distributions of Leucobryum camdidum between hemispheres are mostly across the South Atlantic. This moss occurs all across the east coast of Australia; it can be found in Queensland, New South Wales, Victoria, and Tasmania. The species can also be found in Lord Howe Island, New Zealand, and New Caledonia. It is the most widespread species of Leucobryum in Australia, and can be found throughout the entire state of Tasmania.

L. candidum primarily grows on dead wood, soft bark, and the trunks of tree ferns occupying rainforests and wet sclerophyll forests, ranging up to 1100m altitude. Additionally, it resides by creeks and amongst rocks in drier sclerophyll forests in Victoria.
