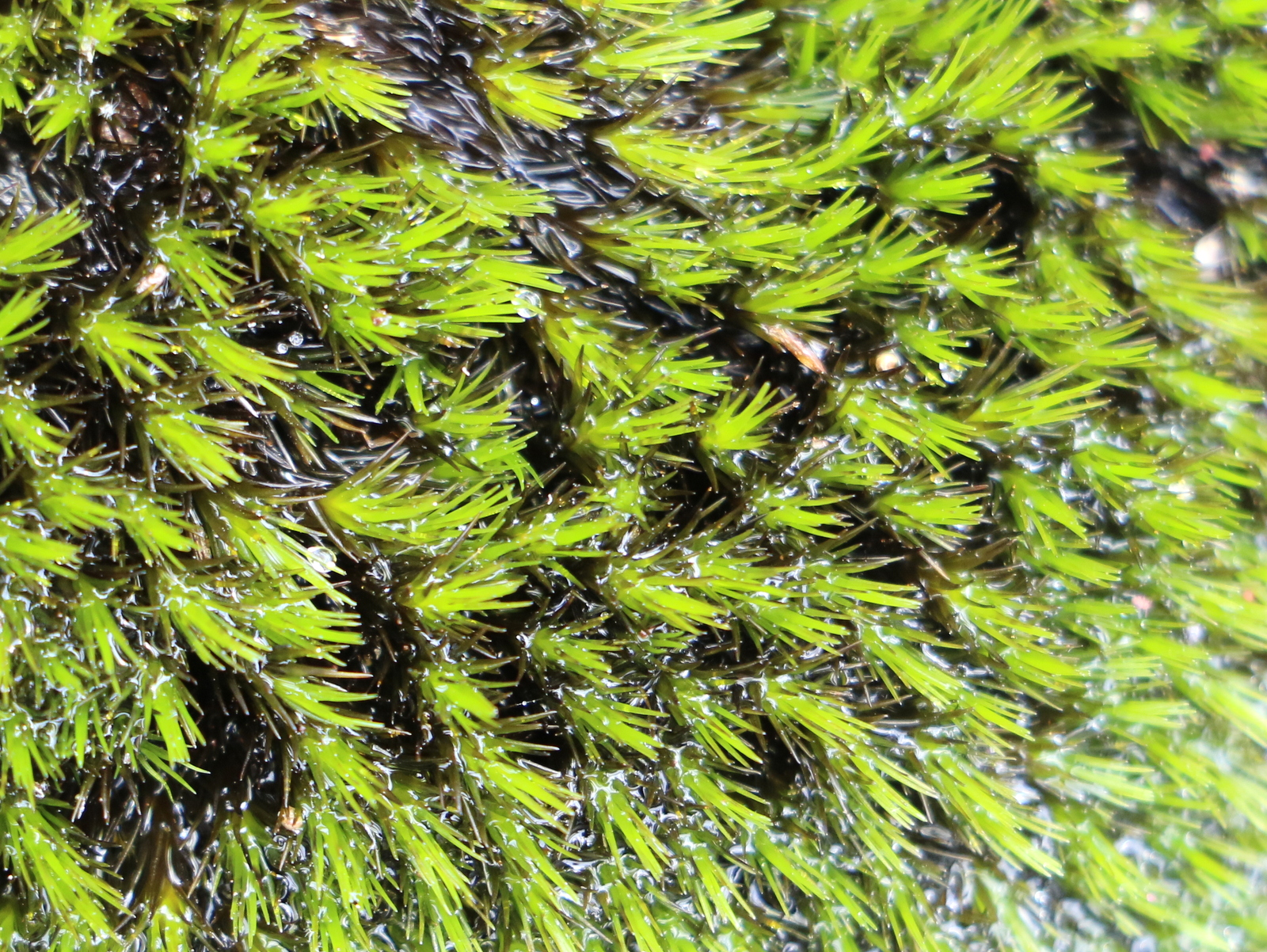
- close up of moss after rain

Scientific classification
- Kingdom: Plantae
- Division: Bryophyta
- Class: Bryopsida
- Subclass: Dicranidae
- Order: Dicranales
- Family: Leucobryaceae
- Genus: Campylopus
- Species: C. bicolor

Binomial name
- Campylopus bicolor (Müll.Hal.) Wilson

Synonyms
- List: Dicranum bicolor Hornsch. ex Müll.Hal.; Campylopus ericeticola Müll.Hal.; Campylopus stewartii R.Br.bis; Campylopus bicolor var. ericeticola (Müll.Hal.) Dixon; Campylopus bicolor var. intermedius R.Br.bis; Campylopus ericeticola var. minor Müll.Hal.

= Campylopus bicolor =

Species of moss

Campylopus bicolor is a species of moss found in Australia, New Zealand, and South Africa. It is characterised by blackish colouration, leaves with distinctive hood-like tips, and a broad central strand occupying up to four-fifths of the leaf width. The species plays an important role in rock colonisation, forming moss "aprons" or mats that can store significant moisture and provide microhabitats for other plants. Two varieties are recognised: the typical form (var. bicolor) with hood-like leaf tips, and the rarer var. ericeticola with hair-like points. In Australia, it is found across several states from Western Australia to Tasmania, while in South Africa it occurs only in the Table Mountain area.

== Taxonomy ==
Campylopus bicolor was first described by the German bryologist Karl Müller, and the combination was later made by William Wilson in Joseph Dalton Hooker's work Flora Novae-Zelandiae (1854).

The species has two recognised varieties:

- C. bicolor var. bicolor – the typical (nominate) form
- C. bicolor var. ericeticola (C.Muell.) Dix.

Campylopus subbicolor Geh. & Broth. is now considered synonymous with C. bicolor. While C. atroluteus from South Africa was initially considered a subspecies of C. bicolor due to morphological similarities, molecular studies have since revealed them to be distinct species. The genetic distance between them is characteristic of separate species, with no evidence of gene flow between the South African and Australian/New Zealand populations, suggesting long-term geographical isolation.

The distribution pattern of C. bicolor between Australia and Southern Africa parallels that of the plant family Proteaceae, reflecting ancient continental connections from approximately 90 million years ago when Australia and Southern Africa were connected via Antarctica.

== Description ==
Campylopus bicolor is a species of moss characterised by several distinctive features. The plants appear blackish in colour and grow upwards to reach heights of around 2 centimetres. The leaves are arranged around the stem and end in blunt, hood-like (cucullate) tips, rather than the pointed tips found in many related species. While these cucullate tips are typically short and broad, they can sometimes be very long and narrow, making the hood-like shape less distinct. A notable anatomical feature is its very broad central strand (costa) which occupies between two-thirds and four-fifths of the leaf width. The costa, which appears as a thickened band running up the middle of each leaf, lacks the additional side nerves seen in some other Campylopus species.

When examined under a microscope, the cells of the leaf reveal diagnostic features. The basal cells are notably thickened (incrassate), while the upper cells appear more or less rectangular to oval in shape. The spore capsules (sporophytes) are occasionally present, measuring approximately 1.5 millimetres in length.

A less common variant of this moss, known as variety ericeticola, differs from the typical form by having leaves that end in hair-like points rather than hood-like tips. While this variety has been observed growing alongside the typical form, suggesting it may be genetically distinct, some specimens have been found with both types of leaf tips on the same plant. This apparent mixture of forms can be explained by the fact that male reproductive structures (perichaetia) in the typical variety are surrounded by leaves with hyaline (translucent) tips, even though the regular leaves are cucullate. Cultivation experiments conducted with var. ericeticola showed that the hair-pointed leaves persisted even under very wet conditions in laboratory settings, suggesting some genetic basis for this trait.

== Habitat, distribution, and ecology ==
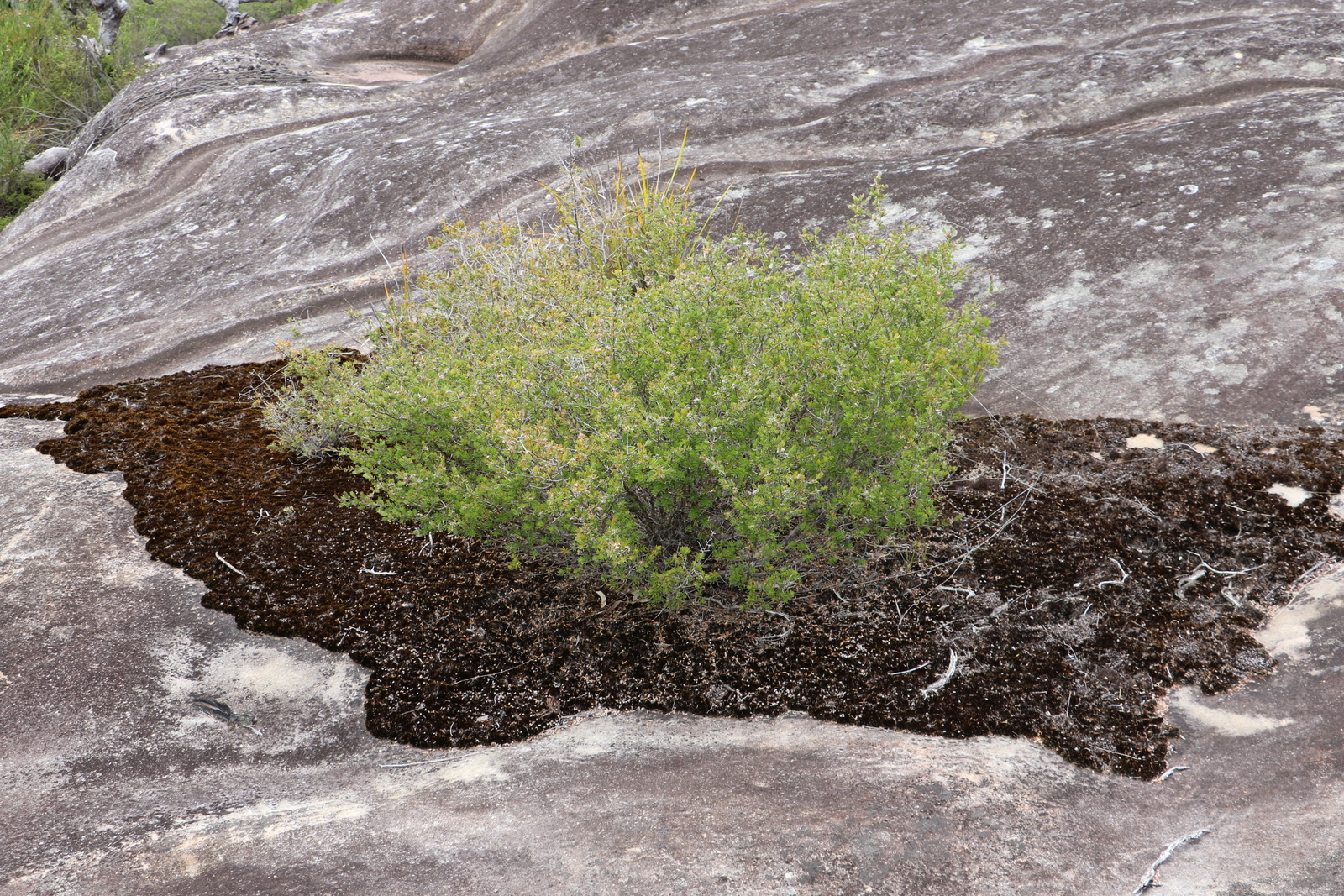
Kunzea rupestris growing on Campylopus bicolor moss

Campylopus bicolor is found in several Australian states, including Western Australia, South Australia, Victoria, New South Wales, and Tasmania. Outside Australia, the species occurs only in South Africa, specifically in the Table Mountain area.

Within its range, C. bicolor grows on open soil, particularly favouring wet sand or earth-covered rocks. It can be found on both sandstone and granite substrates. Historical collections demonstrate the species' long-term presence in Australia, including specimens from Waverley Cemetery, Sydney, dating back to 1899.

The species plays an important role in rock colonisation, forming moss "aprons" or mats on rock faces that can grow on slopes up to 20 degrees. These mats are often held in place by the roots of surrounding shrubs. The moss cushions accumulate 1–2 cm of humus sand and gravel and exist in a constant state of build-up and break-down, with flat and domed forms representing different stages of development. While these moss mats can store significant amounts of moisture, this water is quickly lost through evaporation, and during drought periods, the mats are often close to wilting point in their upper layers. The mats provide important microhabitats for annual plants and geophytes, which grow there during winter and spring.

The variety ericeticola is considerably rarer, being recorded only from South Australia and Victoria. On at least one occasion, both varieties have been found growing together in the same location, specifically near Nerriga, New South Wales.
