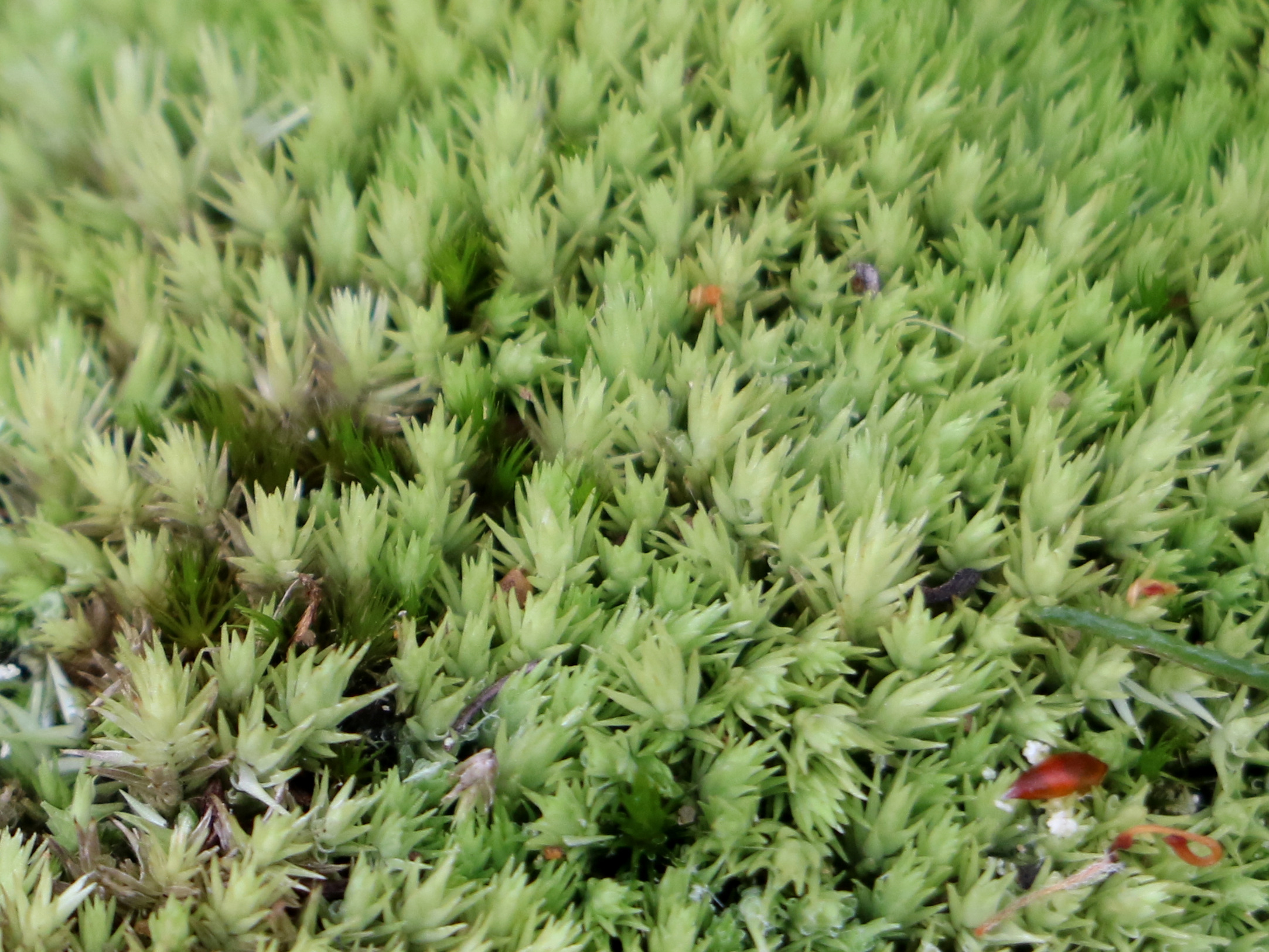

Scientific classification
- Kingdom: Plantae
- Division: Bryophyta
- Class: Bryopsida
- Subclass: Dicranidae
- Order: Dicranales
- Family: Leucobryaceae
- Genus: Leucobryum
- Species: L. albidum

Binomial name
- Leucobryum albidum (Brid. ex P.Beauv.) Lindb.

Synonyms
- Dicranum albidum P.Beauvois; Leucobryum pumilum (Michx.) E.Britton; Leucobryum sediforme Müll.Hal.

= Leucobryum albidum =

Species of plant

Leucobryum albidum (common name pincushion moss) is a species of moss with a wide distribution in the northern and southern hemispheres. This plant first appeared in scientific literature as Dicranum albidum in 1805 published by the French naturalist Palisot de Beauvois.

== Distribution and habitat ==
Pincushion moss is native to and prolific in the Eastern and Midwestern United States, including the states of Alaska, Arkansas, Connecticut, Delaware, Washington D.C., Florida, Georgia, Illinois, Indiana, Kansas, Kentucky, Louisiana, Maine, Maryland, Massachusetts, Michigan, Minnesota, Mississippi, Missouri, New Hampshire, New Jersey, New York, North Carolina, Ohio, Oklahoma, Pennsylvania, Rhode Island, South Carolina, Tennessee, Texas, Vermont, Virginia, West Virginia, Wisconsin.

Elsewhere in North America, it can be found less commonly in Ontario, Canada and is most commonly Southeast of the United States in areas such as Mexico (Tamaulipas), West Indies, Bermuda, Central America. It is also common through Europe into Asia.
