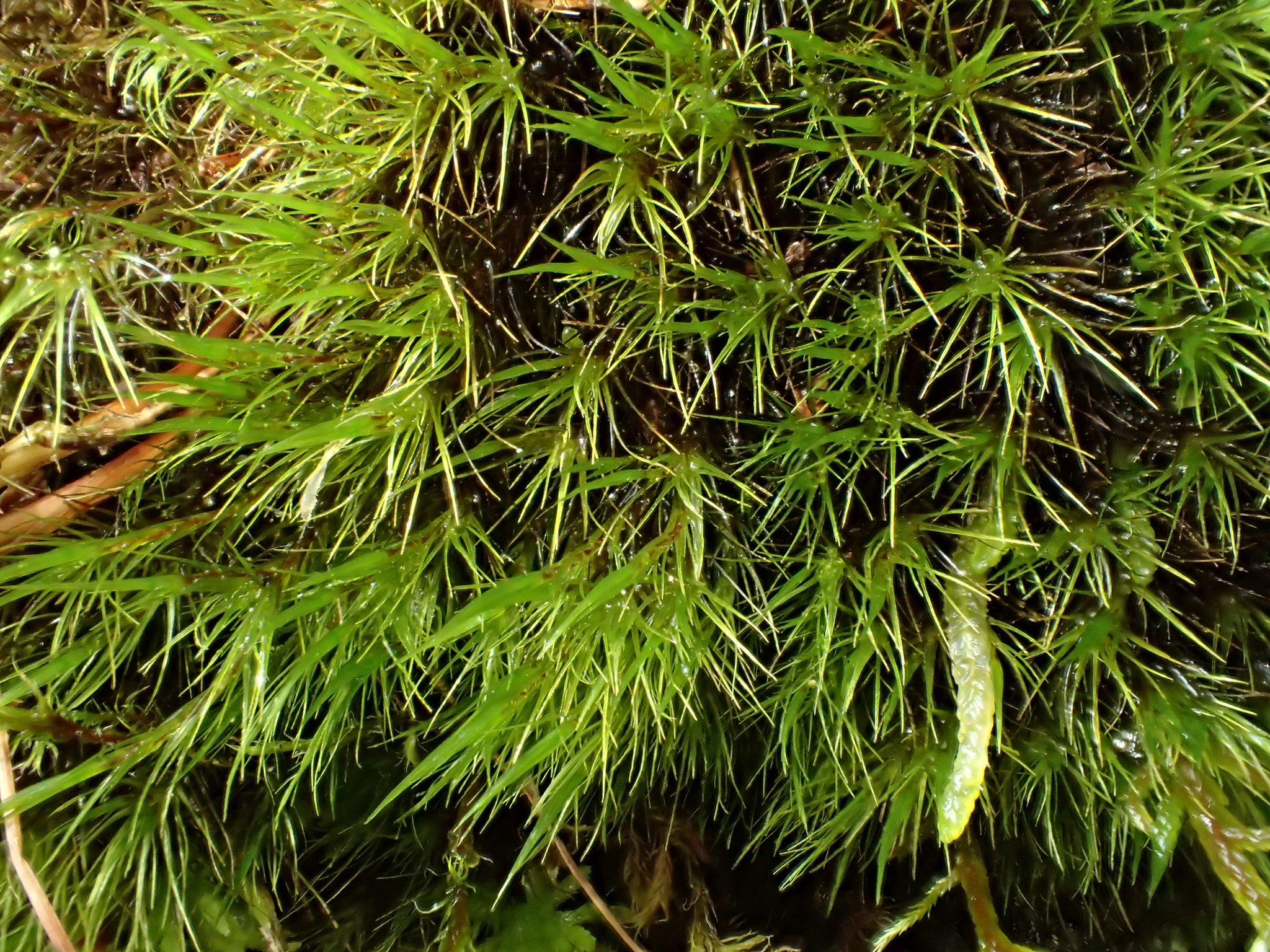

Scientific classification
- Kingdom: Plantae
- Division: Bryophyta
- Class: Bryopsida
- Subclass: Dicranidae
- Order: Dicranales
- Family: Leucobryaceae
- Genus: Campylopus
- Species: C. setifolius

Binomial name
- Campylopus setifolius Wilson

= Campylopus setifolius =

Species of moss

Campylopus setifolius, known as the silky swan-neck moss, is a species of moss in the family Leucobryaceae. The species is only found in the United Kingdom and Ireland.

Campylopus setifolius is restricted to the hyper-oceanic zone of Britain and Ireland, preferring north-facing slopes where Calluna vulgaris is a near constant associate. It can also be found on rock ledges and ravines.
