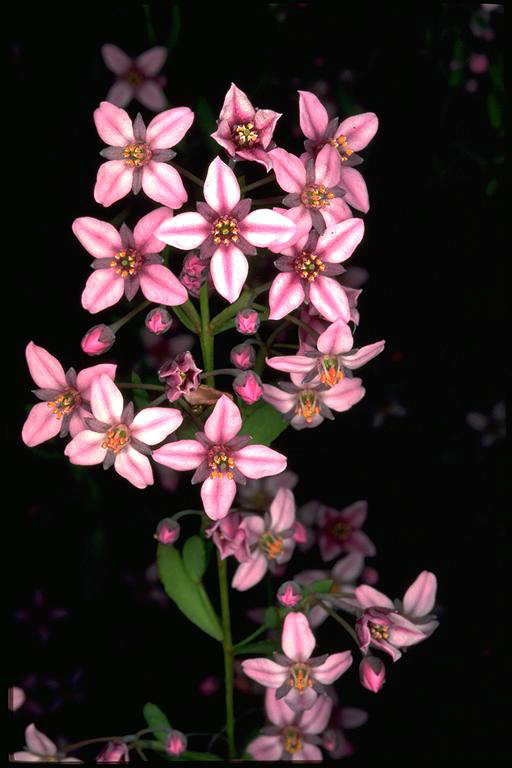

Scientific classification
- Kingdom: Plantae
- Clade: Tracheophytes
- Clade: Angiosperms
- Clade: Eudicots
- Clade: Rosids
- Order: Sapindales
- Family: Rutaceae
- Genus: Boronia
- Species: B. fastigiata

Binomial name
- Boronia fastigiata Bartl.
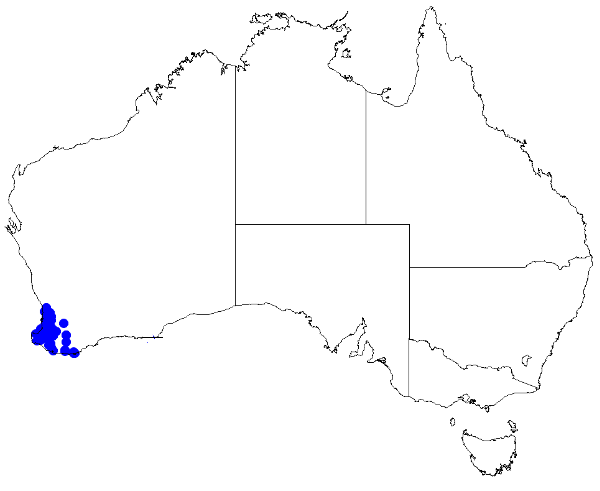
- Occurrence data from Australasian Virtual Herbarium

= Boronia fastigiata =

Bushy boronia

Species of flowering plant

Boronia fastigiata, commonly known as bushy boronia, is a plant in the citrus family, Rutaceae and is endemic to the south-west of Western Australia. It is an erect shrub with small leaves and small groups of red, pink or purple, four-petalled flowers near the ends of the branches.

== Description ==
Boronia fastigiata is an erect shrub that grows to a height of 1 m (3 ft) with leaves that are broadly elliptic or egg-shaped, 10–20 mm (0.39–0.79 in) long and sometimes have serrated edges. The flowers are red, pink or purple and are arranged singly or in small groups in upper leaf axils. The four sepals are egg-shaped and the four petals are about 7.5 mm (0.3 in) long and twice as long as the sepals. The eight stamens are hairy. Flowering mostly occurs from September to December.

== Taxonomy and naming ==
Boronia fastigiata was first formally described in 1845 by Friedrich Gottlieb Bartling and the description was published in Plantae Preissianae. The specific epithet (fastigiata) is derived from the Latin word fastigium meaning "top of a gable" or "ridge of a roof".

== Distribution and habitat ==
Boronia fastigiata grows on flats and hillside, often near streams and occurs between Perth, Albany and Collie in the Jarrah Forest, Swan Coastal Plain and Warren biogeographic regions of Western Australia.

== Conservation ==
Boronia fastigiata is classified as "not threatened" by the Western Australian Government Department of Parks and Wildlife.
