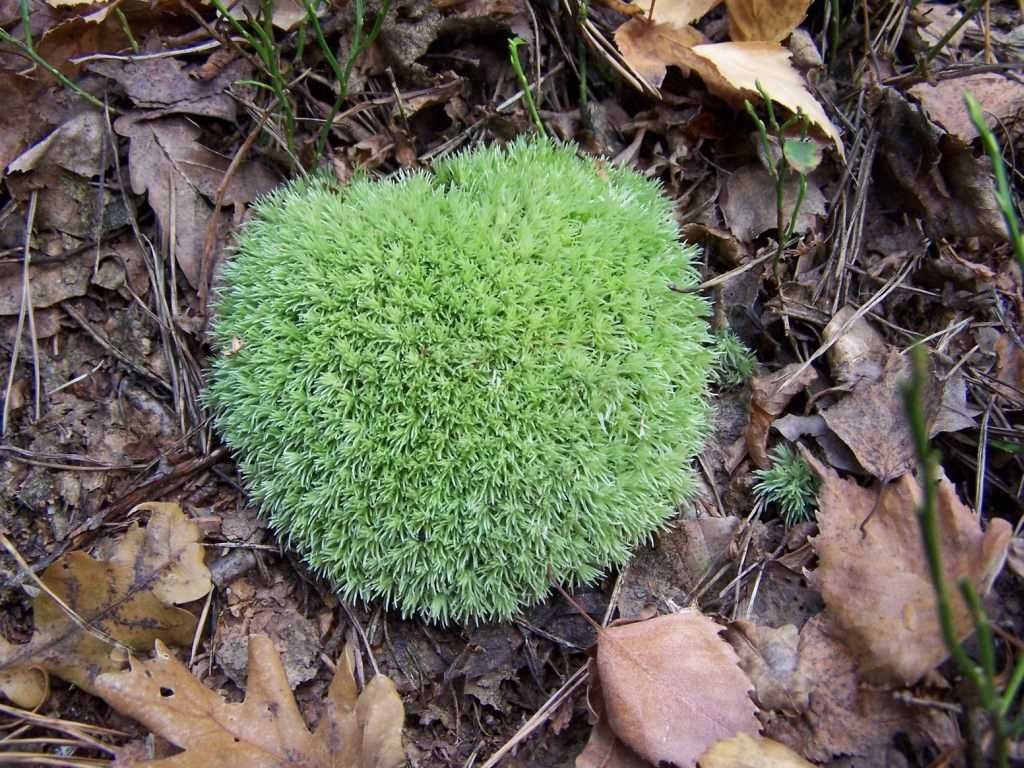
- Leucobryum glaucum

Scientific classification
- Kingdom: Plantae
- Division: Bryophyta
- Class: Bryopsida
- Subclass: Dicranidae
- Order: Dicranales
- Family: Leucobryaceae
- Genus: Leucobryum; Hampe

= Leucobryum =

Genus of haplolepideous mosses

Leucobryum is a genus of haplolepideous mosses (Dicranidae) in the family Leucobryaceae. The name comes from the Greek leukos, meaning white, and bryon, meaning moss.

== Description ==
Leucobryum species are found in erect, dense, and often rounded cushions. Their color varies from white to grayish or bluish-green. Species are characterized by having thick, whitish leaves with a large, expanded costa. It has been suggested that the characteristic pale color exhibited by some species is caused by air bubbles in the leucocysts. The bubbles are theorized to be necessary for the function of the chlorocysts for the purpose of gas exchange.

Species are dioecious, with male plants stunted and found growing among the leaves of the female plants. Sporophytes are rare.

There are approximately 122 species of Leucobryum worldwide. Only two species are known to occur in North America.

== Species ==
Species adapted from The Plant List;

- Leucobryum acutifolium (Mitt.) Cardot
- Leucobryum aduncum Dozy & Molk.
- Leucobryum albicans (Schwägr.) Lindb.
- Leucobryum albidum (Brid. ex P. Beauv.) Lindb.
- Leucobryum antillarum Schimp. ex Besch.
- Leucobryum arfakianum Müll. Hal. ex Geh.
- Leucobryum boninense Sull. & Lesq.
- Leucobryum boryanum Besch.
- Leucobryum bowringii Mitt.
- Leucobryum candidum (Brid. ex P. Beauv.) Wilson
- Leucobryum chlorophyllosum Müll. Hal.
- Leucobryum clavatum Hampe
- Leucobryum crispum Müll. Hal.
- Leucobryum giganteum Müll. Hal.
- Leucobryum glaucum (Hedw.) Ångström
- Leucobryum gracile Sull.
- Leucobryum guadalupense (Lindb.) Paris
- Leucobryum humillimum Cardot
- Leucobryum incurvifolium Müll. Hal.
- Leucobryum iridans (Brid.) E. Britton
- Leucobryum javense (Brid.) Mitt.
- Leucobryum juniperoideum (Brid.) Müll. Hal.
- Leucobryum madagassum Besch.
- Leucobryum martianum (Hornsch.) Hampe ex Müll. Hal.
- Leucobryum mayottense Cardot
- Leucobryum neilgherrense Müll. Hal.
- Leucobryum neocaledonicum Duby ex Besch.
- Leucobryum piliferum (Dozy & Molk.) A. Jaeger
- Leucobryum propaguliferum (Dixon) H. Rob.
- Leucobryum pungens Müll. Hal.
- Leucobryum rehmannii Müll. Hal.
- Leucobryum sanctum (Nees ex Schwägr.) Hampe
- Leucobryum seemannii Mitt.
- Leucobryum sphagnoides (Welw. & Duby) Cardot
- Leucobryum subobtusifolium (Broth.) B.H. Allen
- Leucobryum sumatranum Broth. ex M. Fleisch.
