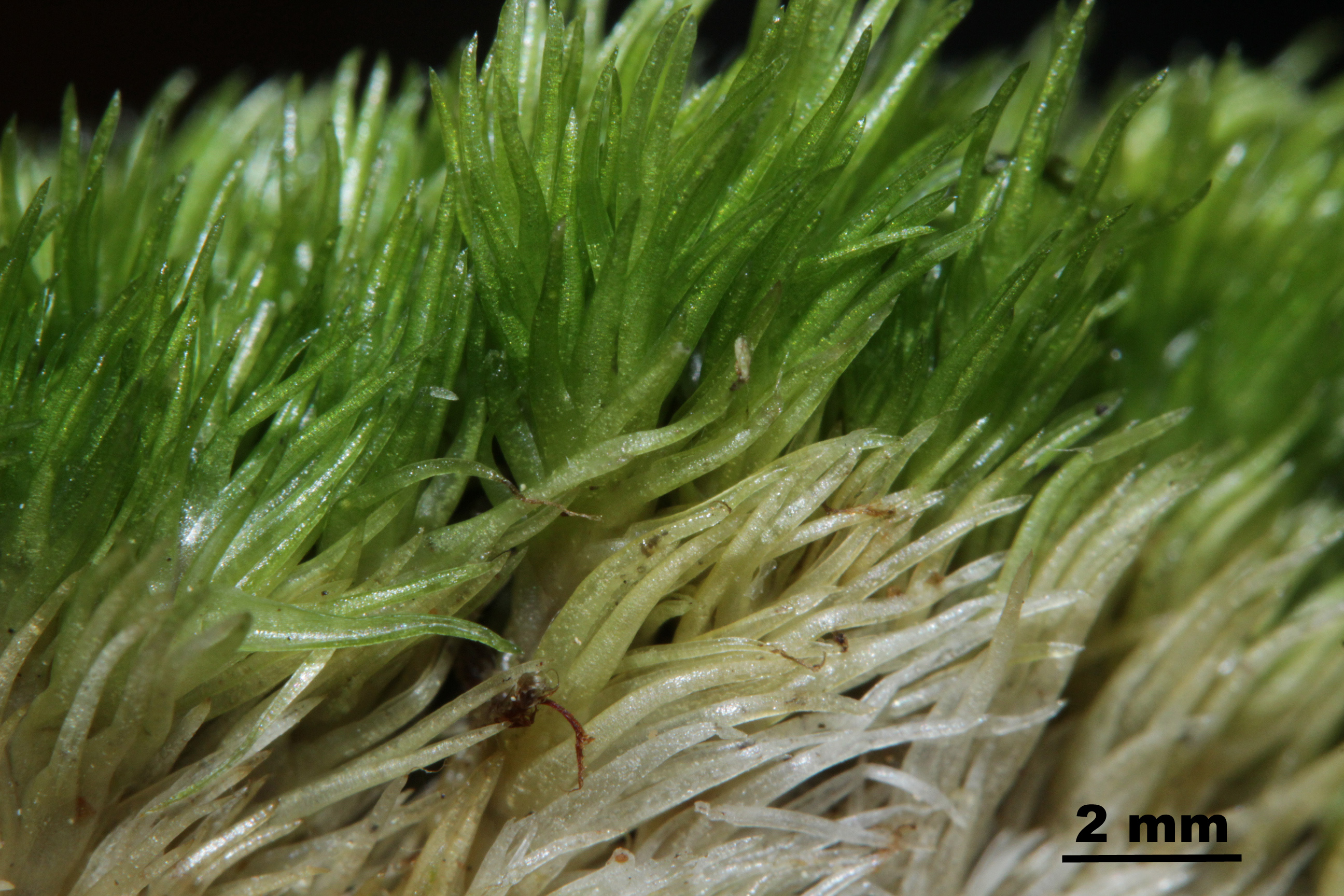

Scientific classification
- Kingdom: Plantae
- Division: Bryophyta
- Class: Bryopsida
- Subclass: Dicranidae
- Order: Dicranales
- Family: Leucobryaceae
- Genus: Leucobryum
- Species: L. juniperoideum

Binomial name
- Leucobryum juniperoideum (Brid.) Müll. Hal.

= Leucobryum juniperoideum =

Species of moss

Leucobryum juniperoideum is a species of mosses belonging to the family Leucobryaceae.

It has cosmopolitan distribution.
