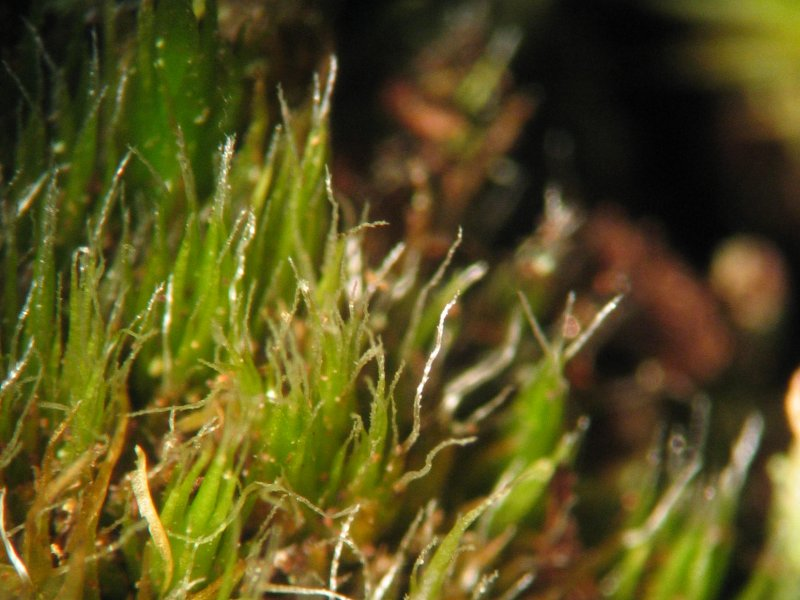
- Campylopus introflexus

Scientific classification
- Kingdom: Plantae
- Clade: Embryophytes
- Division: Bryophyta
- Class: Bryopsida
- Subclass: Dicranidae
- Order: Dicranales
- Family: Leucobryaceae
- Genus: Campylopus
- Species: C. introflexus

Binomial name
- Campylopus introflexus (Hedw.) Brid.
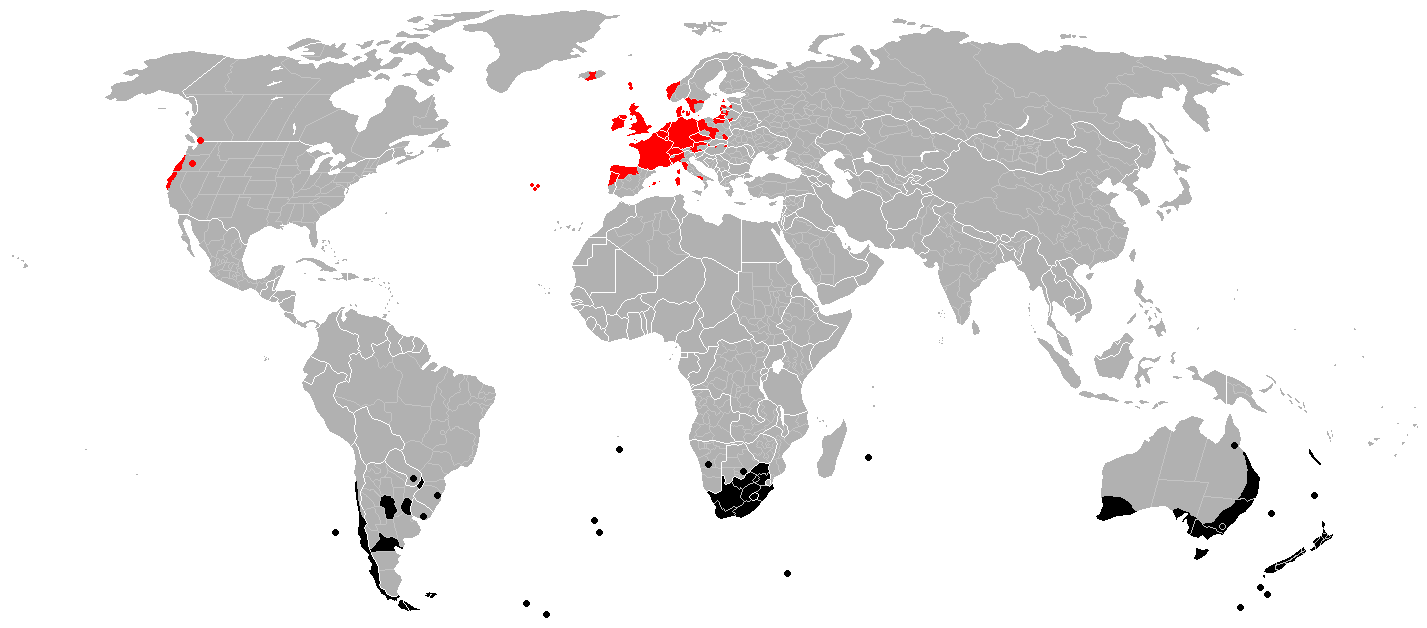
- native range exotic range

Synonyms
- Dicranum introflexum Hedw.

= Campylopus introflexus =

Heath star moss

Species of moss

Campylopus introflexus, also known as the heath star moss, is a species of moss. The first description of the species was made by the German botanist Johannes Hedwig as Dicranum introflexum in 1801.

== Description ==
Individual plants measure 0.5–5 centimetres (0.2–2.0 in), with lanceolate leaves 4–6 mm (0.16–0.24 in). The costa is wide and occupies about half the leaf width. The plants are found in dense mats and extensive carpets and are yellowish to olive green. They are acrocarpous and perennial. Multiple sporophytes are often present in one plant. The seta are between 7 and 12 millimeters in length, and are yellowish brown to brownish. The capsules are brown and 1.5 millimeters long. It produces spores of 12–14 μm in size.

This species will sometimes reproduce asexually by means of stem tips that break off and are distributed by the wind. Even whole cushions can be relocated by wind, animals, and humans to colonize new isolated or remote locations. Once established, they can cover several hundred square meters within ten years.

In the Netherlands and in Belgium, it is called tankmos (tank moss) due to its likely spread by tanks during the Second World War.

== Habitat and distribution ==
It has a native Southern Hemisphere distribution in southern South America, southern part of Africa, southern and eastern Australia, and Atlantic and Pacific islands such as New Zealand, New Caledonia and the South Sandwich Islands.

It is a neophyte in Europe and coastal western North America. In some parts of Europe and North America the species has become mildly invasive, as it temporarily may have a negative and local impact on the diversity. It was first discovered in Britain in 1941, and its spread has been well documented since. In Europe alone, this species has spread in over a one-thousand-mile (1,600 km) radius within the span of 70 years. This correlates to around a 14-mile (23 km) extension of C. introflexus territory every year since its discovery. This does not include its introduction to the Faroe Islands in 1973, the United States in 1975, and British Columbia in 1994. It currently ranges between approximately 35°N (California) and 66°N (Iceland).

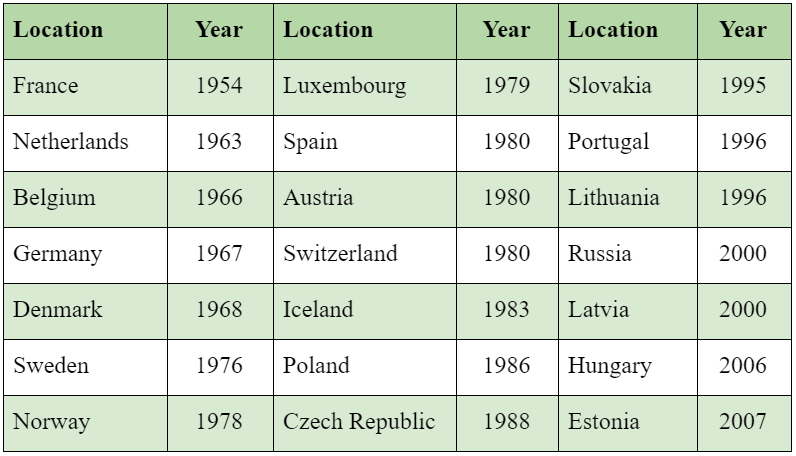
Spread of Campylopus introflexus in Europe since 1954.

It can be found in a variety of settings, often in decalcified habitats such as bogs and dunes. It is a pioneer species found on bare peat after peat-cutting or on bare soils after burning or ploughing. It may also grow on rotting logs, old fence posts, roadsides, mining deposits, and roof shingles.

== Ecological effects ==
The effects of the spread of Campylopus introflexus have been well studied in the Netherlands. A 14-year study found that a lichen dominated grassland became overwhelmingly covered with dense mats of C. introflexus. However, this state was found to be only temporary, with lichens re-colonizing areas within 15–20 years. Studies have also shown that while these C. introflexus mats inhibit germination of Calluna vulgaris plants by up to 60%, seedlings germinated under the carpet grow quicker and mature faster. Additionally, studies have shown C. introflexus can have faster vertical and horizontal growth, giving the species a larger photosynthetic canopy and ability to dominate over competing mosses.

Since moss carpets add more humus to the soil, the soil ecology changes. Many fly species prefer the moister microclimate produced by C. introflexus to protect their larvae from desiccation, and they are found more often around the moss beds. However, species such as ground beetles and spiders are less active and found less often in the moss-encroached dunes, most likely due to a loss of food abundance. As a result, birds such as the tawny pipit which eat arthropods have disappeared from the mossy dunes.

In Iceland, Campylopus introflexus is an invasive species. It's found in multiple geothermal areas and most likely spreads with tourism.

In 2026, a fungus (moss die-back, Bryoscyphus granulosus) was identified in the UK that appeared to specifically attack and kill only this species of moss.

== Taxonomy ==
Campylopus introflexus is closely related to Campylopus pilifer. The name C. introflexus was used previously for C. pilifer, thus all old references for C. introflexus in North America must be referred to that species.

== Response to herbicide application ==
In a study of the effect of the herbicide Asulam on moss growth, Campylopus introflexus was shown to be tolerant to Asulam exposure.
