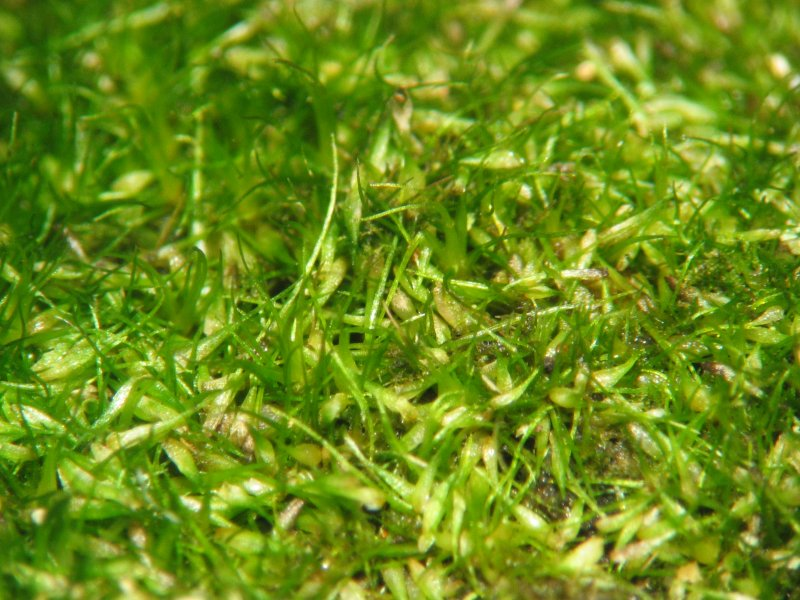

Scientific classification
- Kingdom: Plantae
- Division: Bryophyta
- Class: Bryopsida
- Subclass: Dicranidae
- Order: Dicranales
- Family: Dicranaceae
- Genus: Dicranodontium
- Species: D. denudatum

Binomial name
- Dicranodontium denudatum Britton, 1913

= Dicranodontium denudatum =

Species of moss

Dicranodontium denudatum is a species of moss belonging to the family Dicranaceae.

Synonym:

- Dicranum aquaticum Ehrh.
