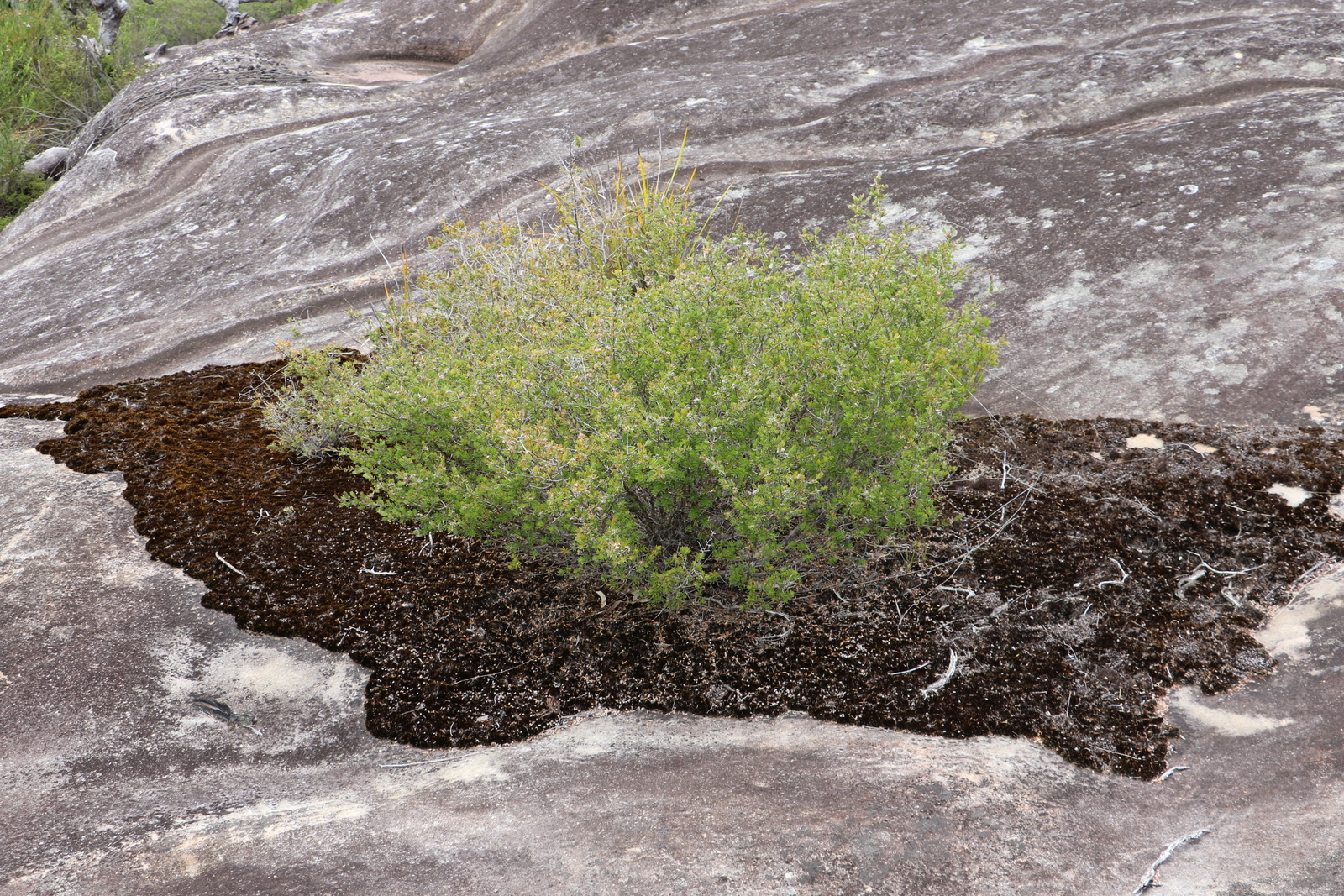
- growing on moss near Cowan Creek, Australia
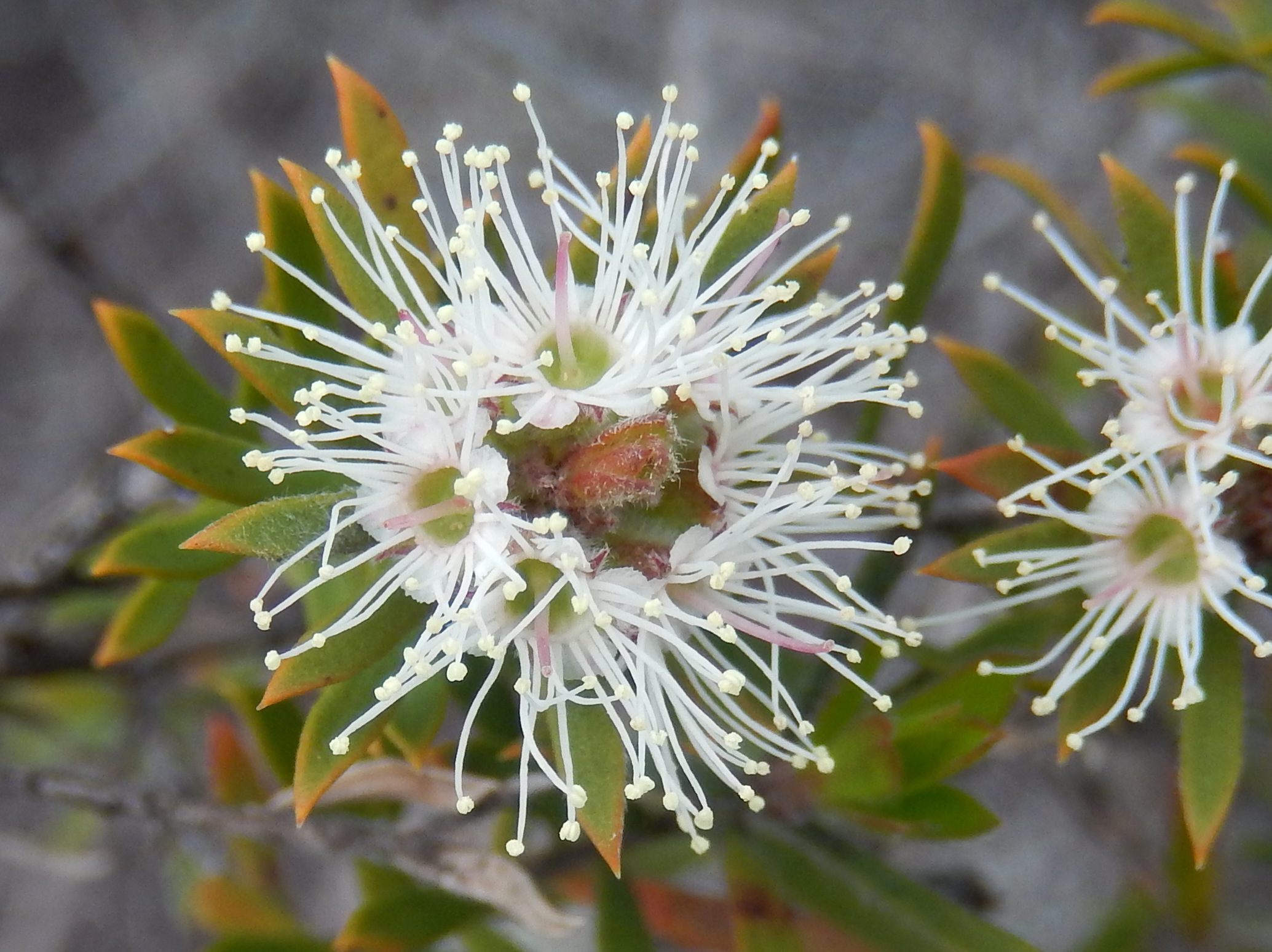

Conservation status
- Vulnerable (EPBC Act)

Scientific classification
- Kingdom: Plantae
- Clade: Tracheophytes
- Clade: Angiosperms
- Clade: Eudicots
- Clade: Rosids
- Order: Myrtales
- Family: Myrtaceae
- Genus: Kunzea
- Species: K. rupestris

Binomial name
- Kunzea rupestris Blakely

= Kunzea rupestris =

Species of plant

Kunzea rupestris, the rocky kunzea, is a rare Australian plant in the myrtle family. There are some 20 known populations, all just north of Sydney, including Ku-ring-gai Chase National Park and Marramarra National Park. Threats to this species include track maintenance, invasive weeds, removal of rocks and sand, fire management and the cut flower industry.

== Description ==
Kunzea rupestris grows as a spreading clonal shrub, 0.5 to 2 metres tall. Foliage is dense with leaves 6 to 11 mm long,1.5 to 3 mm wide. The reverse lanceolate shaped leaves have a triangular shaped tip. New growth is noticeably villous. Mature leaves may be without hairs. White to cream flowers form in stalkless clusters in spring at the edge of branchlets. The sepals have a triangular shape, 1 to 1.5 mm long. Petals are 1 to 1.5 mm long. The hypanthium of the flower is also densely covered in small shaggy hairs.

== Distribution and habitat ==
Kunzea rupestris usually grows on rocky platforms. It is known to occur between Lower Portland in the north and Ku-ring-gai Chase National Park to the south in central New South Wales. Often found in depressions or cracks in the rock with poor quality shallow soil, it is sometimes associated with moss. It grows at elevations between 50 metres and 300 metres above sea level. The habitat is exposed to full sunshine, regular drought, high temperatures, heavy rain and occasional frost and fire.

== Regeneration ==
The indehiscent fruit are 4 to 5 mm long, 2.5 mm wide. They usually do not open at maturity to release seed. These thin-walled fruit have two internal capsules, and support seed dormancy. Placentation is apical, the style is 5 to 6 mm long. The plant regenerates from the base after fire or physical damage. However, seedlings have been observed after fire. Hybrids with Kunzea capitata have been recorded.

== Taxonomy ==
First collected by botanists on bare sandstone rocks near Canoelands in 1927. The rock shelf is in the vicinity of the Colo trig station, at an elevation of 262 metres above sea level. The plant first appeared in scientific literature in the journal of the Linnean Society of New South Wales in 1929, published by William Blakely. The specific epithet rupestris means near rocks.
