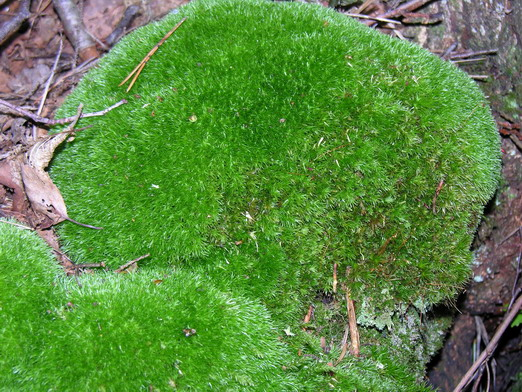

Scientific classification
- Kingdom: Plantae
- Division: Bryophyta
- Class: Bryopsida
- Subclass: Dicranidae
- Order: Dicranales
- Family: Leucobryaceae
- Genus: Leucobryum
- Species: L. glaucum

Binomial name
- Leucobryum glaucum (Hedw.) Ångstr.

Synonyms
- Dicranum glaucum Hedw.; Glaucodipsis frigida K.F. Schimp.

= Leucobryum glaucum =

Species of haplolepideous mosses

Leucobryum glaucum, commonly known as leucobryum moss or pincushion moss, is a species of haplolepideous mosses (Dicranidae) with a wide distribution in eastern North America and Europe. It inhabits temperate forests in the Northern Hemisphere, and its structure allows it to absorb metal ions. Leucobryum glaucum reproduces through Apical growth, Fragmentation, and a form of sexual reproduction called Oogamy. This process requires moist conditions as the sperm can only travel through water

== Human Use ==
Salinity stress is a major issue for crop production. TiO2, a naturally occurring inorganic compound, has been shown to help mitigate some of these issues, but chemically synthesizing these has a negative environmental impact. Biochar is a carbon-rich compound that has been shown to slow the impact of industrial pollution. Both of these compounds were synthesized from pincushion moss biomass and the results were promising. Salinity stress on the Amaranthus dubius (Chinese Spinach) had much less of an impact on production.
