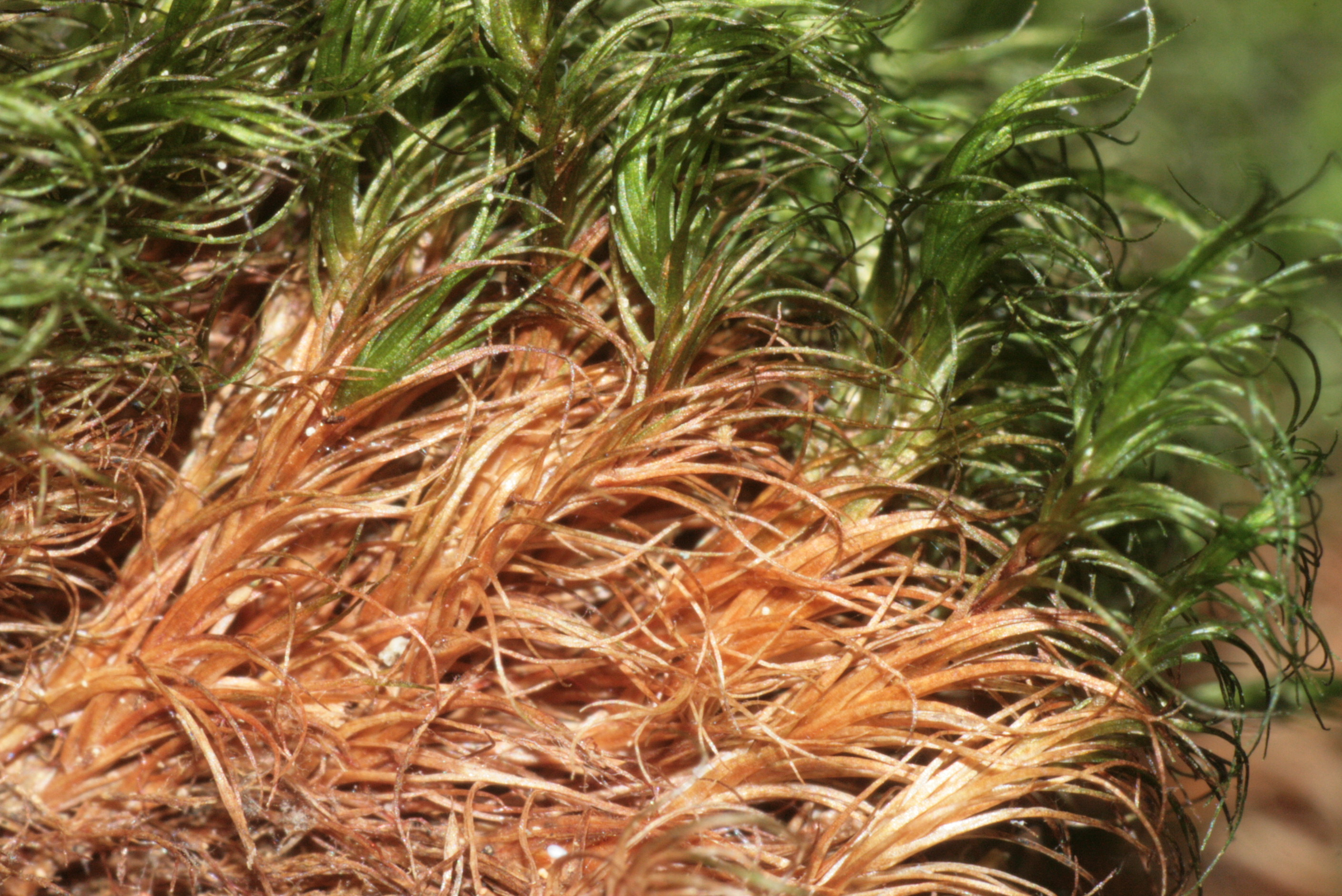
- Campylopus flexuosus

Scientific classification
- Kingdom: Plantae
- Division: Bryophyta
- Class: Bryopsida
- Subclass: Dicranidae
- Order: Dicranales
- Family: Leucobryaceae
- Genus: Campylopus; Brid., 1819

Species
- See text

= Campylopus =

Genus of haplolepideous mosses

Campylopus is a genus of 180 species of haplolepideous mosses (Dicranidae) in the family Leucobryaceae. The name comes from the Greek campylos, meaning curved, and pous, meaning foot, referring to the setae which curve downwards.

== Distribution ==
The genus is represented worldwide, with species found in North America, Mexico, West Indies, Central America, South America, Europe, Asia, Africa, Atlantic Islands, Pacific Islands, and Australia. Campylopus bicolor is an example found in Australia.

The North American list of species from the genus was revised by Jan-Peter Frahm in 1980. This was based on his own study of over 1,000 herbarium specimens. The most recent checklist of the mosses of North America lists 18 species as being present in North American flora. However, due to a misidentification, there are only 17 accepted species in the region.

== Species ==
Species adapted from The Plant List;

- Campylopus abbreviatus (Dixon) Manuel
- Campylopus acicularis (Hedw.) Wahlenb.
- Campylopus acuminatus Mitt.
  - Campylopus acuminatus var. kirkii (Mitt. ex Beckett) J.-P. Frahm
- Campylopus aemulans (Hampe) A. Jaeger
- Campylopus alatus (Broth. ex Iisiba) Z. Iwats. & Nog.
- Campylopus albidovirens Herzog
- Campylopus alpigena Broth.
- Campylopus ambiguus Thér.
- Campylopus amboroensis Thér.
- Campylopus anderssonii (Müll. Hal.) A. Jaeger
- Campylopus andreanus Cardot & P. de la Varde
- Campylopus angustiretis (Austin) Lesq. & James
- Campylopus arbogastii Renauld & Cardot
- Campylopus arboricola Cardot & Dixon
- Campylopus archboldii (E.B. Bartram) E.B. Bartram
- Campylopus arctocarpus (Hornsch.) Mitt.
  - Campylopus arctocarpus subsp. caldensis (Ångström) J.-P. Frahm
  - Campylopus arctocarpus subsp. madecassus (Besch.) J.-P. Frahm
- Campylopus arcuatus (Brid.) A. Jaeger
- Campylopus areodictyon (Müll. Hal.) Mitt.
- Campylopus argyrocaulon (Müll. Hal.) Broth.
- Campylopus asperifolius Mitt.
- Campylopus asperulus (Mitt.) Kindb.
- Campylopus atlanticus B.H. Allen
- Campylopus atroluteus (Müll. Hal.) Paris
- Campylopus atrovirens De Not.
- Campylopus aureonitens (Müll. Hal.) A. Jaeger
- Campylopus australis Catches. & J.-P. Frahm
- Campylopus austro-alpinus (Müll. Hal.) Paris
- Campylopus austrostramineus Thér.
- Campylopus austrosubulatus Broth. & Geh.
- Campylopus bartramiaceus (Müll. Hal.) Dixon & A. Gepp
- Campylopus basalticola (Müll. Hal.) Paris
- Campylopus beauverdianus Thér.
- Campylopus belangeri Thér.
- Campylopus benedictii Herzog
- Campylopus bicolor (Hornsch. ex Müll. Hal.) Wilson
  - Campylopus bicolor subsp. atroluteus (Müll. Hal.) J.-P. Frahm
- Campylopus bolivianus Thér. ex J.-P. Frahm
- Campylopus brevipilus Bruch & Schimp.
  - Campylopus brevipilus var. elatus (Cardot) Cardot
- Campylopus brunneus (Müll. Hal.) Paris
- Campylopus bryotropii J.-P. Frahm
- Campylopus caespitosus (Mitt.) A. Jaeger
- Campylopus caldensis Ångström
- Campylopus cambouei Renauld & Cardot
- Campylopus capillaceus Hook. f. & Wilson
- Campylopus capitulatus E.B. Bartram
- Campylopus carolinae Grout
- Campylopus catarractilis (Müll. Hal.) Paris
- Campylopus caudatus (Müll. Hal.) Mont.
- Campylopus cavifolius Mitt.
- Campylopus chevalieri Broth. & Thér.
- Campylopus chilensis De Not.
- Campylopus chionophilus (Müll. Hal.) Mitt.
- Campylopus chrismarii (Müll. Hal.) Mitt.
- Campylopus chrysodictyon (Hampe) Mitt.
- Campylopus circinatus J.-P. Frahm
- Campylopus cirrhatus Brid.
- Campylopus clavatus (R. Br.) Wilson
- Campylopus cleefii J.-P. Frahm
- Campylopus clemensiae E.B. Bartram
- Campylopus cockaynii R. Br. bis
- Campylopus comatus Renauld & Cardot
- Campylopus comosus (Schwägr.) Bosch & Sande Lac.
- Campylopus concolor (Hook.) Brid.
- Campylopus contortus (Wahlenb.) Brid.
- Campylopus coreensis Cardot
- Campylopus crassissimus Besch.
- Campylopus crateris Besch.
- Campylopus cribrosus Brid.
- Campylopus crispatulus Thér.
- Campylopus cruegeri (Müll. Hal.) Paris
- Campylopus cryptopodioides Broth.
- Campylopus cubensis Sull.
- Campylopus cucullatifolius Herzog
- Campylopus cuspidatus (Hornsch.) Mitt.
- Campylopus cygneus (Hedw.) Brid.
- Campylopus decaryi Thér.
- Campylopus densicoma (Müll. Hal.) Paris
- Campylopus denudatus (Brid.) Kindb.
  - Campylopus denudatus var. uncinatus (Harv.) Kindb.
- Campylopus dichrostris (Müll. Hal.) Paris
- Campylopus dicnemoides (Müll. Hal.) Paris
- Campylopus dicranoides Thér. & Naveau
- Campylopus didictyon (Mitt.) A. Jaeger
- Campylopus didymodon (Griff.) A. Jaeger
- Campylopus dietrichiae (Müll. Hal.) A. Jaeger
- Campylopus durelii Gangulee
- Campylopus edithae Broth.
- Campylopus ellipticus (Turner) Brid.
- Campylopus ericeticola Müll. Hal.
- Campylopus ericoides (Griff.) A. Jaeger
- Campylopus euphorocladus (Müll. Hal.) Bosch & Sande Lac.
- Campylopus exaltatus (Müll. Hal.) Paris
- Campylopus exasperatus (Nees & Blume) Brid.
  - Campylopus exasperatus var. lorentzii (M. Fleisch.) J.-P. Frahm
- Campylopus exfimbriatus Müll. Hal.
- Campylopus extinctus J.-P. Frahm
- Campylopus ferromecoae Paris
- Campylopus filicuspis Broth.
- Campylopus filifolius (Hornsch.) Mitt.
- Campylopus filiformis J.-P. Frahm & C.C. Towns.
- Campylopus flaccidus Renauld & Cardot
- Campylopus flagellaceus (Müll. Hal.) Mitt.
- Campylopus flagellifer (Müll. Hal.) A. Jaeger
- Campylopus flavonigritus Dusén
- Campylopus flexuosus (Hedw.) Brid.
  - Campylopus flexuosus var. incacorralis (Herzog) J.-P. Frahm
  - Campylopus flexuosus var. paradoxus (Wilson) Husn.
- Campylopus flindersii Catches. & J.-P. Frahm
- Campylopus fragiliformis J.-P. Frahm
- Campylopus fragilis (Brid.) Bruch & Schimp.
- Campylopus fragilis f. densus (Bruch & Schimp.) Mönk.
  - Campylopus fragilis subsp. fragiliformis (J.-P. Frahm) J.-P. Frahm
  - Campylopus fragilis subsp. goughii (Mitt.) J.-P. Frahm
- Campylopus fragilis f. muelleri (Jur.) Smirnova
  - Campylopus fragilis var. pyriformis (Schultz) Agst.
  - Campylopus fragilis subsp. zollingerianus (Müll. Hal.) J.-P. Frahm
- Campylopus fulvus (Hook.) Kindb.
- Campylopus funalis (Schwägr.) Brid.
- Campylopus fuscocroceus (Hampe) A. Jaeger
- Campylopus fuscolutescens Renauld & Cardot
- Campylopus galapagensis J.-P. Frahm & Sipman
- Campylopus gardneri (Müll. Hal.) Mitt.
- Campylopus gastro-alaris (Müll. Hal.) Paris
- Campylopus gemmatus (Müll. Hal.) Paris
- Campylopus gemmiparus Z. Iwats., J.-P. Frahm, Tad. Suzuki & Takaki
- Campylopus geraensis Paris
- Campylopus gibboso-alaris (Broth. & Paris) Wijk & Margad.
- Campylopus gracilentus Cardot
- Campylopus gracilis (Mitt.) A. Jaeger
- Campylopus grimmioides (Müll. Hal.) Paris
- Campylopus griseus (Hornsch.) A. Jaeger
- Campylopus guaitecae Dusén
- Campylopus handelii Broth.
- Campylopus harpophyllus Herzog
- Campylopus hawaiicus (Müll. Hal.) A. Jaeger
  - Campylopus hawaiicus var. densifolius (Ångström) J.-P. Frahm
  - Campylopus hawaiicus var. hawaiicoflexuosus (Müll. Hal.) J.-P. Frahm
- Campylopus hensii Renauld & Cardot
- Campylopus heterostachys (Hampe) A. Jaeger
- Campylopus hildebrandtii (Müll. Hal.) A. Jaeger
- Campylopus hoffmannii (Müll. Hal.) Renauld & Cardot
- Campylopus homalobolax (Müll. Hal.) Paris
- Campylopus huallagensis Broth.
- Campylopus humoricola (Müll. Hal.) Paris
- Campylopus incacorralis Herzog
- Campylopus incertus Thér.
- Campylopus incrassatus Müll. Hal.
- Campylopus incurvatus J.-P. Frahm & Hoe
- Campylopus ingeniensis R.S. Williams
- Campylopus introflexus (Hedw.) Brid.
  - Campylopus introflexus var. altecristatus (Renauld & Cardot) Thér.
  - Campylopus introflexus var. tullgrenii (Renauld & Cardot) Thér.
- Campylopus irrigatus Thér.
- Campylopus itacolumitis (Müll. Hal.) Broth.
- Campylopus jamesonii (Hook.) A. Jaeger
- Campylopus johannis-meyeri (Müll. Hal.) Paris
- Campylopus joshii Broth. ex Pichonet & Bardat
- Campylopus jugorum Herzog
- Campylopus julaceus A. Jaeger
  - Campylopus julaceus subsp. arbogastii (Renauld & Cardot) J.-P. Frahm
- Campylopus julicaulis Broth.
- Campylopus kaalaasii I. Hagen
- Campylopus kirkii Mitt. ex Beckett
- Campylopus kivuensis P. de la Varde & Thér.
- Campylopus laevis Taylor
- Campylopus lamellinervis (Müll. Hal.) Mitt.
- Campylopus lamprodictyon (Hampe) Mitt.
- Campylopus laniger (Müll. Hal.) Besch.
- Campylopus laxitextus Sande Lac.
- Campylopus laxoventralis Herzog ex J.-P. Frahm
- Campylopus leptotrichaceus (Müll. Hal.) Paris
- Campylopus leucochlorus (Müll. Hal.) Paris
- Campylopus liebmannii (Müll. Hal.) Schimp.
- Campylopus liliputanus (Müll. Hal.) Broth.
- Campylopus longescens (Müll. Hal.) Paris
- Campylopus longicellularis J.-P. Frahm
- Campylopus lorentzii (M. Fleisch.) W. Schultze-Motel
- Campylopus luteus (Müll. Hal.) Paris
- Campylopus macgregorii Broth. & Geh.
- Campylopus macrogaster (Müll. Hal.) Broth.
- Campylopus madecassus Besch.
- Campylopus magniretis (Müll. Hal.) Paris
- Campylopus marginatulus Geh.
- Campylopus megalotus Besch.
- Campylopus milleri Renauld & Cardot
- Campylopus modestus Cardot
- Campylopus nanophyllus Müll. Hal. ex Broth.
- Campylopus nepalensis (Brid.) A. Jaeger
- Campylopus nivalis (Brid.) Brid.
  - Campylopus nivalis var. multicapsularis (Müll. Hal.) J.-P. Frahm
- Campylopus oblongus Thér.
- Campylopus obrutus Thér. & P. de la Varde
- Campylopus occultus Mitt.
- Campylopus oerstedianus (Müll. Hal.) Mitt.
- Campylopus orthocomus (Besch. ex Müll. Hal.) Besch.
- Campylopus orthopelma (Müll. Hal.) Paris
- Campylopus orthopodius (Müll. Hal.) Broth.
- Campylopus ovalis (Hedw.) Wahlenb.
- Campylopus pachyneuros (Molendo) A.W.H. Walther & Molendo
- Campylopus pascuanus J.-P. Frahm
- Campylopus patens (Dicks. ex Hedw.) Brid.
- Campylopus pauper (Hampe) Mitt.
  - Campylopus pauper var. lamprodictyon (Hampe) J.-P. Frahm
  - Campylopus pauper var. minor (Hampe) A. Jaeger
- Campylopus pelidnus (Stirt.) Stirt.
- Campylopus percurvatus Müll. Hal.
- Campylopus perexilis (Müll. Hal.) Paris
- Campylopus perichaetialis P. de la Varde & Thér.
- Campylopus perpusillus Mitt.
- Campylopus perrottetii (Mont.) M. Fleisch.
- Campylopus peruvianus R.S. Williams
- Campylopus pilifer Brid.
  - Campylopus pilifer var. lamellatus (Mont.) Gradst. & Sipman
  - Campylopus pilifer subsp. vaporarius (De Not.) Brullo, Privitera & M. Puglisi
- Campylopus pittieri R.S. Williams
  - Campylopus pittieri var. congestus (Thér.) J. Florsch. & Florsch.
- Campylopus pleurocarpus (Müll. Hal.) Paris
- Campylopus praemorsus (Müll. Hal.) A. Jaeger
- Campylopus praetermissus J.-P. Frahm
- Campylopus pseudobicolor Müll. Hal. ex Renauld & Cardot
- Campylopus pseudomuelleri Cardot
- Campylopus pseudonanus (Müll. Hal.) A. Jaeger
- Campylopus pterotoneuron (Müll. Hal.) A. Jaeger
- Campylopus ptychotheca Herzog
- Campylopus pulvinatus (Hedw.) Brid.
- Campylopus purpureocaulis Dusén
- Campylopus pyriformis (Schultz) Brid.
- Campylopus rauei (Austin) Paris
- Campylopus reconditus (Thwaites & Mitt.) A. Jaeger
- Campylopus recurvifolius Dusén
- Campylopus recurvus (Mitt.) A. Jaeger
- Campylopus reflexisetus (Müll. Hal.) Broth.
- Campylopus refractus J.-P. Frahm
- Campylopus revolvens Herzog
- Campylopus richardii Brid.
- Campylopus robillardei Besch.
  - Campylopus robillardei var. perauriculatus (Broth.) J.-P. Frahm
- Campylopus rosulatus (Hampe) Mitt.
- Campylopus savannarum (Müll. Hal.) Mitt.
- Campylopus saxicola (F. Weber & D. Mohr) Brid.
- Campylopus schimperi J. Milde
- Campylopus schmidii (Müll. Hal.) A. Jaeger
  - Campylopus schmidii subsp. hemitrichius (Müll. Hal.) J.-P. Frahm
- Campylopus scoposum Hampe ex Müll. Hal.
- Campylopus scottianus (Turner ex Scott, Robert) Brid.
- Campylopus searellii R. Br. bis
- Campylopus sehnemii E.B. Bartram
- Campylopus sellowii (Hornsch.) A. Jaeger
- Campylopus sericeoides Dixon
- Campylopus serratus Sande Lac.
- Campylopus serrifolius (Broth. & Paris) J.-P. Frahm
- Campylopus setifolius Wilson
- Campylopus sharpii J.-P. Frahm, D.G. Horton & Vitt
- Campylopus shawii Wilson
- Campylopus sinensis (Müll. Hal.) J.-P. Frahm
- Campylopus smaragdinus (Brid.) A. Jaeger
- Campylopus sordidus (Wilson ex Mitt.) A. Jaeger
- Campylopus spiralis Dusén
- Campylopus standleyi E.B. Bartram
- Campylopus subchlorophyllosus Müll. Hal.
- Campylopus subcomosus Dixon
- Campylopus subconcolor (Hampe) Mitt.
- Campylopus subcuspidatus (Hampe) A. Jaeger
  - Campylopus subcuspidatus var. damazii (Broth.) J.-P. Frahm
- Campylopus subfalcatus (Hornsch.) A. Jaeger
- Campylopus subfragilis Renauld & Cardot
- Campylopus subjugorum Broth.
- Campylopus subluteus (Mitt.) A. Jaeger
- Campylopus subnanus (Müll. Hal.) A. Jaeger
- Campylopus subnitens Kaal.
- Campylopus subporodictyon (Broth.) B.H. Allen & Ireland
- Campylopus subtrachyblepharus Müll. Hal.
- Campylopus subulatus Schimp. ex J. Milde
  - Campylopus subulatus var. elongatus (Bosw.) Dixon
  - Campylopus subulatus f. expallidus (Stirt.) Podp.
- Campylopus surinamensis Müll. Hal.
- Campylopus taiwanensis Sakurai
- Campylopus tallulensis Sull. & Lesq.
- Campylopus tenax (Müll. Hal.) Paris
- Campylopus tenuinervis M. Fleisch.
- Campylopus tenuissimus Sull.
- Campylopus terebrifolius (Müll. Hal.) A. Jaeger
- Campylopus thwaitesii (Mitt.) A. Jaeger
- Campylopus torfaceus Bruch & Schimp.
- Campylopus torrentis Thér. & P. de la Varde
- Campylopus trachyblepharon (Müll. Hal.) Mitt.
  - Campylopus trachyblepharon subsp. comatus (Renauld & Cardot) J.-P. Frahm
- Campylopus trichophylloides Thér. ex Herzog
- Campylopus trivialis Müll. Hal. ex E. Britton
- Campylopus uleanus (Müll. Hal.) Broth.
- Campylopus uncinatus (Harv.) Dozy & Molk.
- Campylopus valerioi B.H. Allen
- Campylopus validinervis (Dixon) B.C. Tan
- Campylopus vesticaulis Mitt.
- Campylopus walkeri (Mitt.) A. Jaeger
- Campylopus weberbaueri Broth.
- Campylopus weddelii Besch.
- Campylopus wheeleri (Müll. Hal.) Hampe ex Paris
- Campylopus widgrenii (Müll. Hal.) Mitt.
- Campylopus yungarum Herzog
- Campylopus zollingerianus (Müll. Hal.) Bosch & Sande Lac.
- Campylopus zygodonticarpus (Müll. Hal.) Paris
