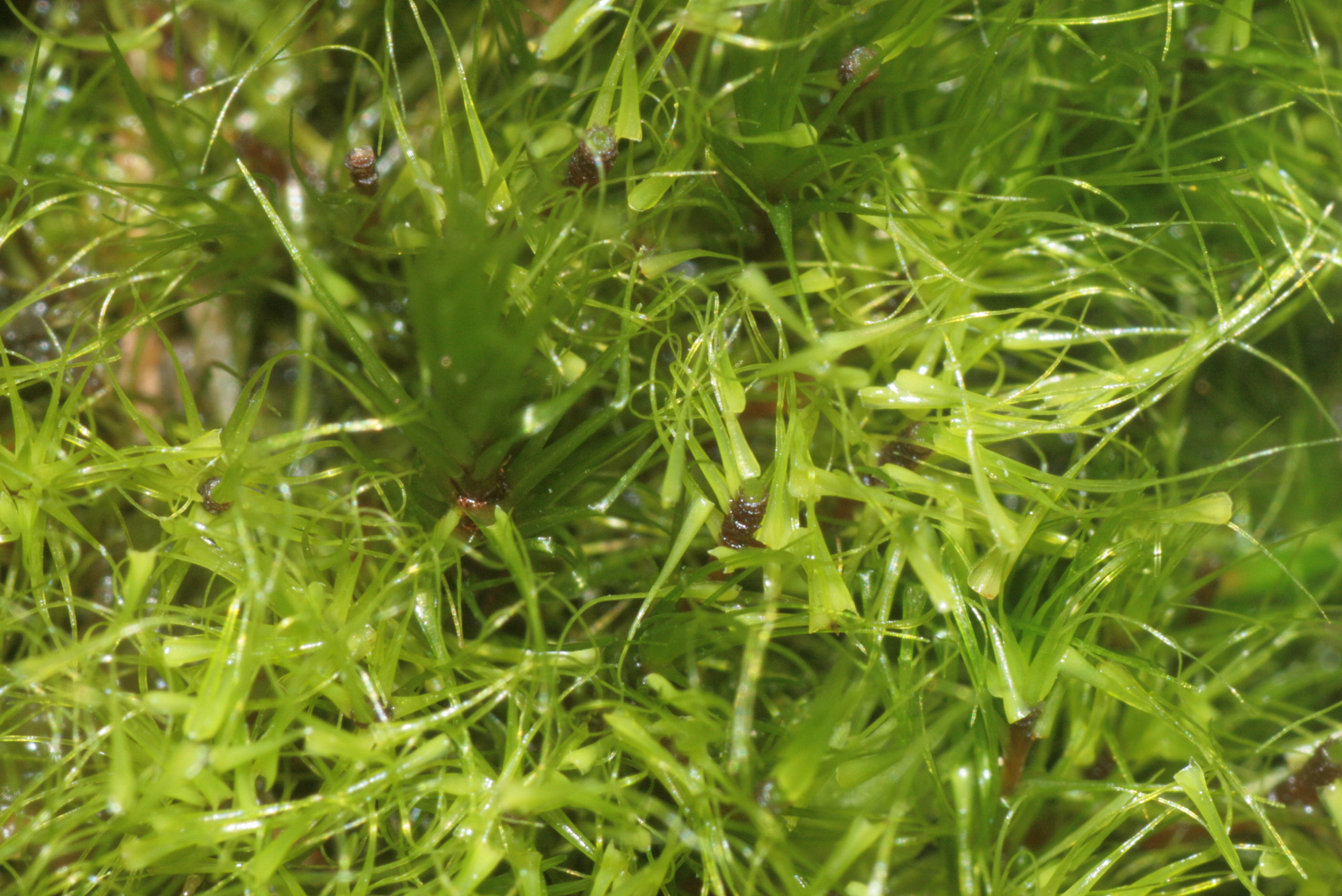
- Dicranodontium denudatum

Scientific classification
- Kingdom: Plantae
- Division: Bryophyta
- Class: Bryopsida
- Subclass: Dicranidae
- Order: Dicranales
- Family: Dicranaceae
- Genus: Dicranodontium; Bruch & Schimp.

= Dicranodontium =

Genus of mosses

Dicranodontium is a genus of mosses belonging to the family Dicranaceae.

The genus was first described by Bruch and Wilhelm Philippe Schimper.

The genus has cosmopolitan distribution.

Species:

- Dicranodontium denudatum Britton, 1913
