= Georg Ernst Ludwig Hampe =

German pharmacist, botanist and bryologist

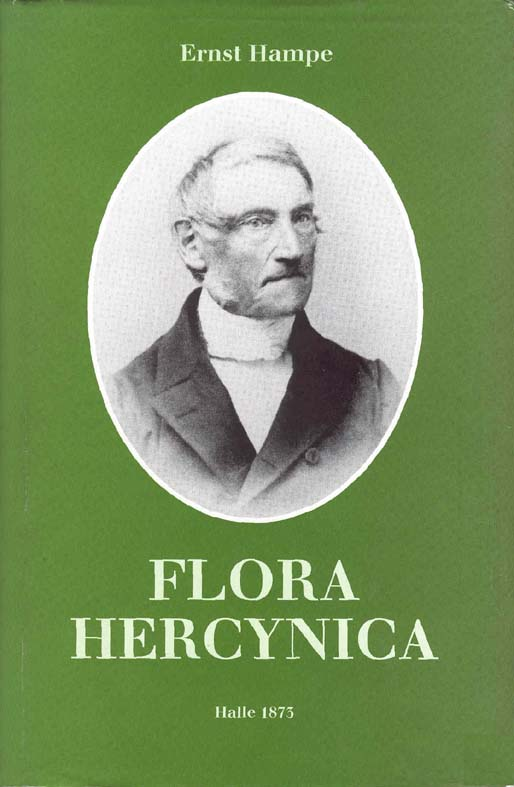
Picture of Ernst Hampe on the front cover of Flora Hercynica

Georg Ernst Ludwig Hampe (5 July 1795 – 23 November 1880) was a German pharmacist, botanist and bryologist who was a native of Fürstenberg.

In 1810 he became an apprentice pharmacist to his uncle in Brakel, and over the next fifteen years worked in several different pharmacies, including one in Halle an der Saale, where he made the acquaintance of botanist Kurt Sprengel (1766-1833). He also worked at the university pharmacy in Göttingen, and at establishments in Allendorf and Braunschweig. In 1825 he became head of a local pharmacy in Blankenburg am Harz, where he remained its director up until 1864. With Friedrich Gottlieb Bartling he edited the exsiccatae Vegetabilia cellularia in Germania septentrionali praesertim in Hercynia et in agro Göttingensi. Ser. A-D (1832-1845).

During his time spent in Blankenburg, Hampe collected and studied flora native to the Harz Mountains. He was particularly interested in mosses, and through his association with bryologist Karl Müller (1818-1899), he became exposed to non-European species from the Americas, Madagascar, New Zealand, Australia, et al. In his collaborative research with Müller, he described numerous new bryological species.

Later in life, Hampe received an honorary professorship from the University of Göttingen. In 1876 he sold his pharmacy in Blankenburg, and moved to Helmstedt, where he went to live with his son. After Hampe's death, his large herbarium was acquired by the British Museum of Natural History.

The plant genus Hampea from the family Malvaceae was named in his honor by Dietrich von Schlechtendal (1794-1866).

== Selected publications ==
- Prodromus flora Hercynicae (Halle 1836, Nordhausen 1842).
- Vegetabilia cellularia in Germania septentrionali praesertim in Hercynia et in agro Gottingensi lecta (1834 and 1836), with Friedrich Gottlieb Bartling (1798–1875).
- Icones muscorum novorum vel minus cognitorum (Bonn 1844).
- Flora Hercynica oder Aufzählung der im Harzgebiete wildwachsenden Gefässpflanzen (1873) – Flora Hercynica or enumeration of vascular plants native to the Harz region.
- Flora Hercynica (Halle 1875).
