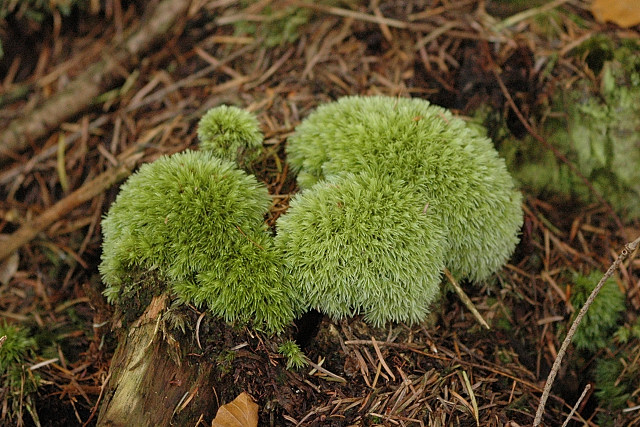
- Leucobryum glaucum

Scientific classification
- Kingdom: Plantae
- Division: Bryophyta
- Class: Bryopsida
- Subclass: Dicranidae
- Order: Dicranales
- Family: Leucobryaceae; Schimp.

= Leucobryaceae =

Family of haplolepideous mosses

Leucobryaceae is a family of haplolepideous mosses (Dicranidae) in the order Dicranales.

== Description ==
Members of the family grow small to large cushions. Species are characterized by having thick, whitish leaves with a large, expanded costa. It has been suggested that the characteristic pale color exhibited by some species is caused by air bubbles in the leucocysts, and the presence of air in the leaf is assumed characteristic of the Leucobryaceae.

== Classification ==
The Leucobryaceae have been sometimes included in the Dicranaceae because of similar costa and peristome structures.

The number of genera assigned to the family has been subject to much debate and has ranged from one to fourteen. Some genera previous assigned to Leucobryaceae have been split off into the family Calymperaceae, while molecular analyses have led to other changes, with other genera from Dicranaceae included.

The family currently includes twelve genera:

- Atractylocarpus Mitt.
- Brothera Müll. Hal.
- Bryohumbertia P. de la Varde & Thér.
- Campylopodiella Cardot
- Campylopus Brid.
- Cladopodanthus Dozy & Molk.
- Dicranodontium Bruch & Schimp.
- Leucobryum Hampe
- Microcampylopus (Müll. Hal.) Fleisch.
- Ochrobryum Mitt.
- Pilopogon Brid.
- Schistomitrium Dozy & Molk.
