= Friedrich Gottlieb Bartling =

German botanist (1798–1875)

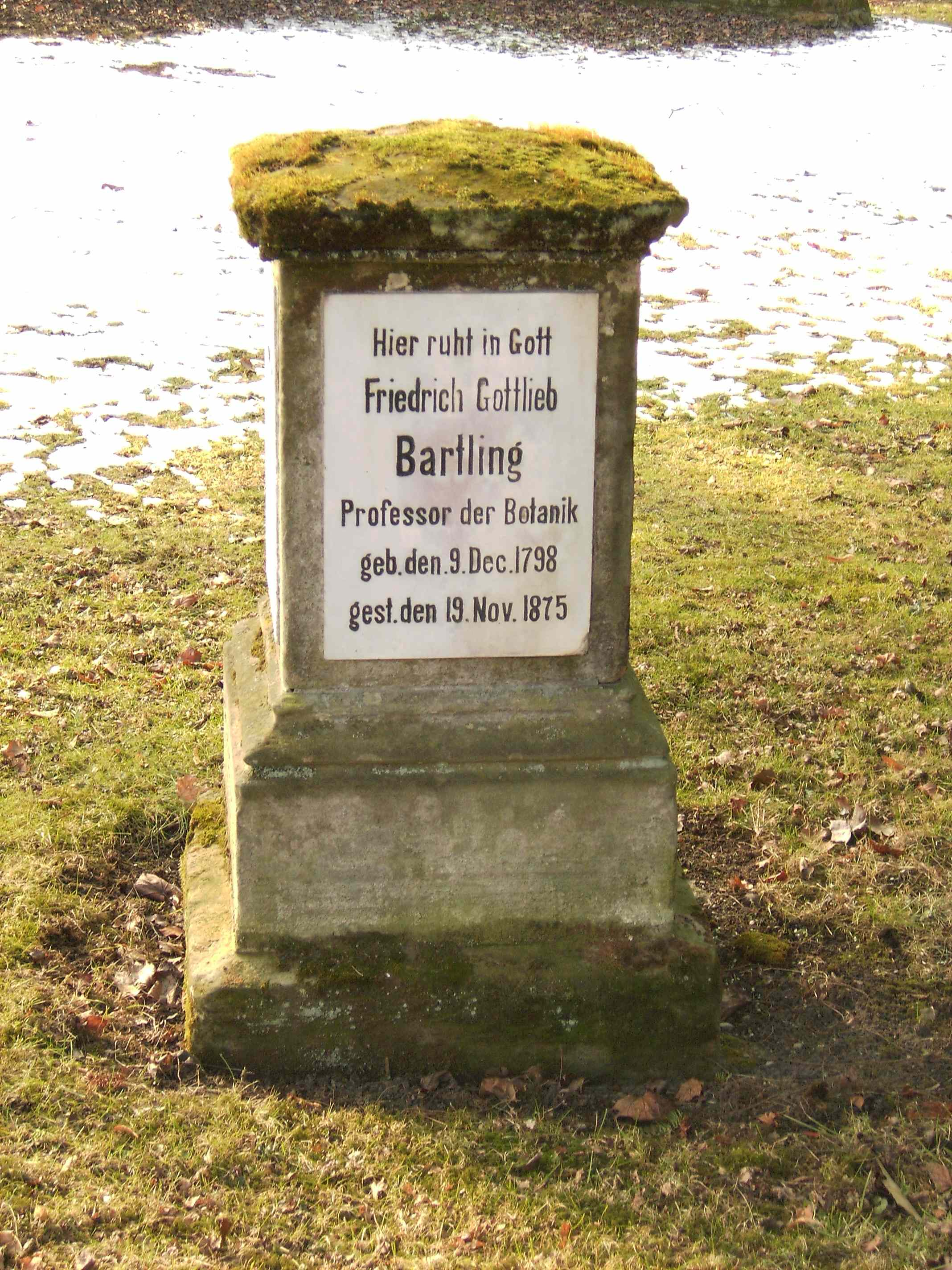
Grave of Friedrich Gottlieb Bartling in Göttingen

Friedrich Gottlieb Bartling (December 9, 1798 – November 20, 1875) was a German botanist who was a native of Hanover.

He studied natural sciences at the University of Göttingen, and in 1818 took a botanical journey through Hungary and Croatia. In 1822, he became a lecturer at Göttingen, where he later became a professor. In 1837, he was appointed director of its botanical garden. With Georg Ernst Ludwig Hampe he edited the four exsiccatae Vegetabilia cellularia in Germania septentrionali praesertim in Hercynia et in agro Göttingensi. Ser. A-D (1832-1845).

The plant genus Bartlingia from the family Rubiaceae is named in his honor.

== Selected publications ==
- De litoribus ac insulis maris Liburnici (1820).
- Ordines naturales plantarum (1830).
- Flora der österreichischen Küstenländer, (Flora of the Austrian coastal area), (1825).
- Vegetabilia cellularia in Germania septentrionali praesertim in Hercynia et in agro Gottingensi lecta (1834 and 1836), with Georg Ernst Ludwig Hampe (1795–1880).
