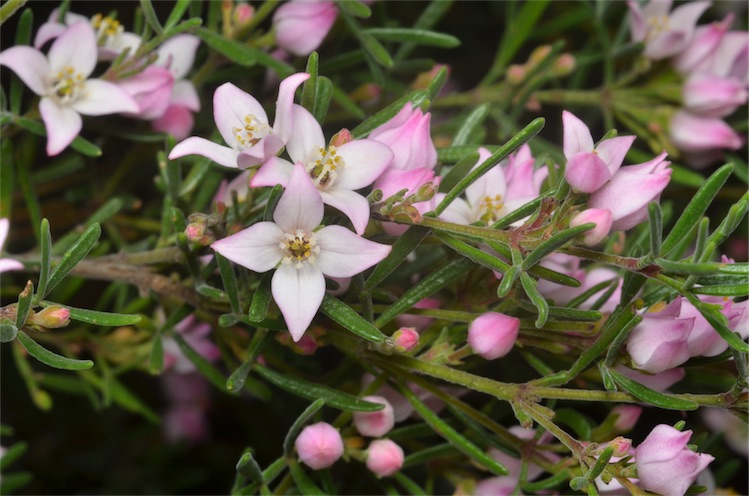
- Boronia hippopalus in the Royal Tasmanian Botanical Gardens

Conservation status
- Vulnerable (EPBC Act)

Scientific classification
- Kingdom: Plantae
- Clade: Tracheophytes
- Clade: Angiosperms
- Clade: Eudicots
- Clade: Rosids
- Order: Sapindales
- Family: Rutaceae
- Genus: Boronia
- Species: B. hippopalus

Binomial name
- Boronia hippopalus Duretto
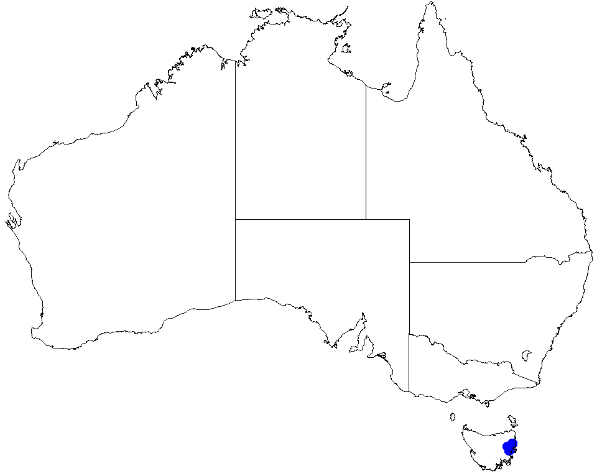
- Occurrence data from Australasian Virtual Herbarium

= Boronia hippopalus =

Velvet boronia

Species of flowering plant

Boronia hippopalus, commonly known as velvet boronia is a plant in the citrus family Rutaceae and is endemic to Tasmania. It is an erect, woody shrub with pinnate leaves and white to pink, four-petalled flowers.

== Description ==
Boronia hippopalus is an erect, woody shrub that grows to about 1.5 m (5 ft) high and its branches and leaves covered with minute hairs. The leaves have three, five or seven leaflets and are 6–10 mm (0.2–0.4 in) long and 6–14 mm (0.2–0.6 in) wide in outline on a petiole 2–3 mm (0.08–0.1 in) long. The end leaflet is linear to narrow elliptic, 1–4 mm (0.04–0.2 in) long and 1–2 mm (0.04–0.08 in) wide and the side leaflet are similar but longer. The flowers are white to pink and are arranged singly or in groups of up to three in upper leaf axils, the groups on a peduncle up to 1 mm (0.04 in) long. The four sepals are narrow triangular, 1–2 mm (0.04–0.08 in) long and 0.5–1 mm (0.02–0.04 in) wide. The four petals are 3.5–4.5 mm (0.1–0.2 in) long and the eight stamens are hairy. Flowering occurs from October to January and the fruit is a capsule about 2.5 mm (0.1 in) long and 1.5 mm (0.06 in) wide.

== Taxonomy and naming ==
Boronia hippopala was first formally described in 2003 by Marco F. Duretto who published the description in Muelleria from a specimen collected on Mount Arthur. The specific epithet (hippopalus) is derived from the words meaning "horse" and "marsh", referring to Horseshoe Marsh, one of the only three locations where this species occurs. However, hippopala is an orthographical variant because there is no feminine form of the Latin word palus and the spelling must be corrected to hippopalus.

== Distribution and habitat ==
The velvet boronia grows in wet heath or scrub. It is only known from three populations near St Pauls River in northern Tasmania.

== Conservation ==
Boronia hippopalus, (as B. hippopala) is listed as "vulnerable" under the Commonwealth Government Environment Protection and Biodiversity Conservation Act 1999 (EPBC) Act and the Tasmanian Government Threatened Species Protection Act 1995.The main threats to the species are dieback caused by Phytophthora cinnamomi, inappropriate fire regimes and changes in water flow.
