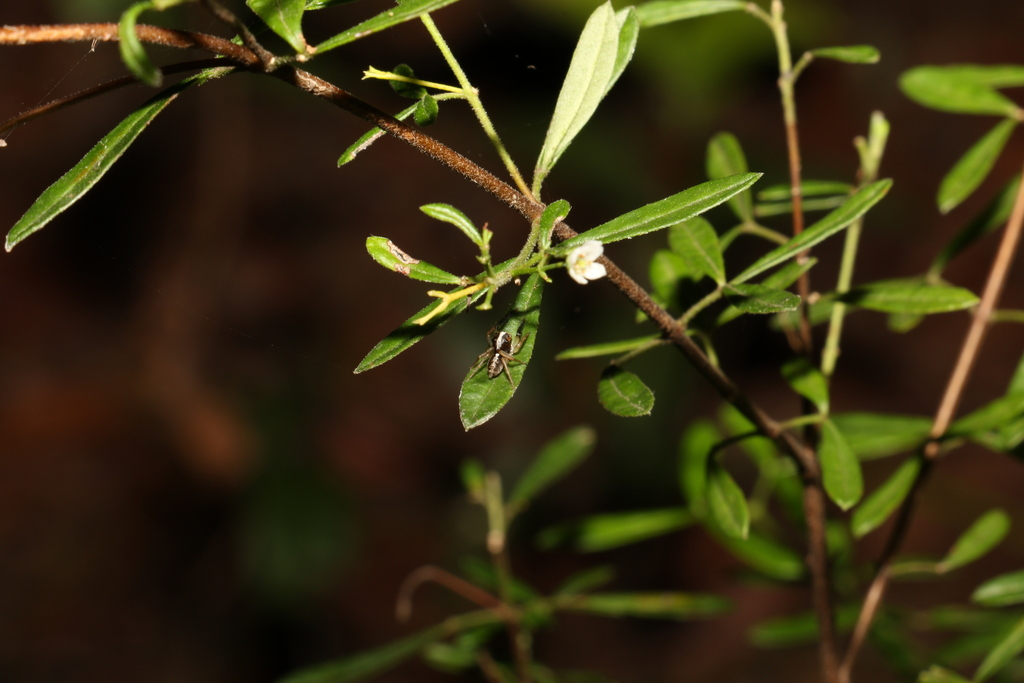
- Near Palmview

Scientific classification
- Kingdom: Plantae
- Clade: Tracheophytes
- Clade: Angiosperms
- Clade: Eudicots
- Clade: Rosids
- Order: Sapindales
- Family: Rutaceae
- Genus: Zieria
- Species: Z. exsul

Binomial name
- Zieria exsul Duretto & P.I.Forst.

= Zieria exsul =

Species of shrub

Zieria exsul is a plant in the citrus family Rutaceae and is endemic to a small area of southeast Queensland. It is an open, straggly shrub with hairy branches, three-part leaves and white flowers in groups of up to twelve, the groups longer than the leaves and each flower with four petals and four stamens.

== Description ==
Zieria exsul is an open, weak, straggly shrub which grows to a height of 60 cm (20 in) and has relatively smooth but hairy branches. The three-part leaves have a petiole 2–3 mm (0.08–0.1 in) long and a central leaflet which is egg-shaped, 10–16 mm (0.4–0.6 in) long, 2–5 mm (0.08–0.2 in) wide with the other two leaflets slightly smaller. The upper surface of the leaf is slightly hairy but the lower surface is densely hairy with woolly, star-shaped hairs.

The flowers are white and are arranged singly or in groups of up to twelve in leaf axils on a mostly glabrous stalk 10–19 mm (0.4–0.7 in) long, the groups longer than the leaves. The sepals are more or less triangular, about 1 mm (0.04 in) long and wide and the four petals are elliptic in shape, about 2 mm (0.08 in) long and 1.5 mm (0.06 in) wide. The four stamens are less than 1 mm (0.04 in) long. Flowering occurs mostly occurs between August and September and is followed by fruit which is a glabrous capsule, about 3 mm (0.1 in) long and 2 mm (0.08 in) wide. This species is similar to Zieria compacta except that it is a more straggly shrub and has glabrous flower stalks.

== Taxonomy and naming ==
Zieria exsul was first formally described in 2007 by Marco Duretto and Paul Irwin Forster from a specimen collected in Caloundra and the description was published in Austrobaileya. The specific epithet (exsul) is a Latin word meaning "a banished person" referring to this species having been displaced from most of its probable former range.

== Distribution and habitat ==
This zieria grows in woodland and wallum heathland near Buderim and Caloundra in the South East Queensland biogeographic region.

== Conservation ==
Zieria exsul is listed as "endangered" under the Queensland Nature Conservation Act 1992.
