= Boronia viridiflora =

Conservation status
- Vulnerable (EPBC Act)

- Vulnerable (TPWCA)

Scientific classification
- Kingdom: Plantae
- Clade: Tracheophytes
- Clade: Angiosperms
- Clade: Eudicots
- Clade: Rosids
- Order: Sapindales
- Family: Rutaceae
- Genus: Boronia
- Species: B. viridiflora

Binomial name
- Boronia viridiflora Duretto
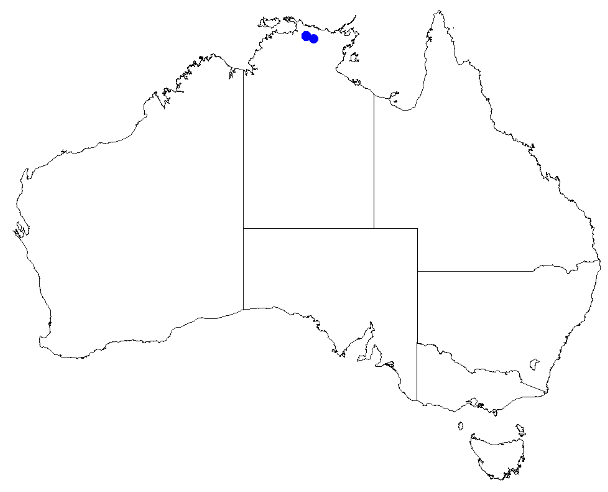
- Occurrence data from Australasian Virtual Herbarium

Species of flowering plant

Boronia viridiflora is a species of shrub that is endemic to a small area in the Northern Territory and grows horizontally from vertical rock faces. The flowers are borne singly or in groups of up to three in leaf axils and are green with a burgundy tinge.

== Description ==
Boronia viridiflora is a shrub that typically grows to a height of about 1.5–2 m (4 ft 11 in – 6 ft 7 in) growing horizontally from vertical rock faces. The plant is glabrous apart from the petals. Its leaves are elliptical to lance-shaped, 8–40 mm (0.31–1.57 in) long and 7–16 mm (0.28–0.63 in) wide on a petiole 0.5–3.5 mm (0.020–0.138 in) long. The flowers are borne singly or in groups of up to three in leaf axils on a peduncle 0.5–3 mm (0.020–0.118 in) long. The flowers are surrounded by leaf-like prophylls 0.5–12 mm (0.020–0.472 in) long and 1–3 mm (0.039–0.118 in) wide and the sepals are egg-shaped to triangular, about 3 mm (0.12 in) long, 2 mm (0.079 in) wide and green and burgundy-coloured. The petals are green, about 3 mm (0.12 in) long and 2 mm (0.079 in) wide. The sepals and petals do not enlarge significantly as the fruit develops. Flowering occurs between March and September and the fruit is a glabrous capsule about 5 mm (0.20 in) long and 3 mm (0.12 in) wide.

== Taxonomy and naming ==
Boronia viridiflora was first formally described in 1997 by Marco F. Duretto who published the description in the journal Australian Systematic Botany. The specific epithet (viridiflora) is derived from the Latin viridis meaning "green" and -florus meaning "-flowered", referring to the colour of the flowers.

== Distribution and habitat ==
This boronia is only known from two populations that grow on vertical sandstone rock faces in privately managed land in Arnhem Land.

== Conservation status ==
This species is classified as "vulnerable" under the Australian Government Environment Protection and Biodiversity Conservation Act 1999 and the Territory Parks and Wildlife Conservation Act 2000. Prior to 2006, the estimated population size was estimated to be about 700, but Cyclone Monica may have had severely damaged the populations and the current population size is unknown. The populations are also threatened by altered fire regimes. A National Recovery Plan for this species and B. quadrilata has been prepared.
