= Pterostylis mystacina =

Scientific classification
- Kingdom: Plantae
- Clade: Tracheophytes
- Clade: Angiosperms
- Clade: Monocots
- Order: Asparagales
- Family: Orchidaceae
- Subfamily: Orchidoideae
- Tribe: Cranichideae
- Genus: Pterostylis
- Species: P. mystacina

Binomial name
- Pterostylis mystacina (D.L.Jones) Janes & Duretto

Synonyms
- Oligochaetochilus mystacinus D.L.Jones

Species of orchid

Pterostylis mystacina is a plant in the orchid family Orchidaceae and is endemic to Queensland. It was first formally described in 2010 by David Jones and given the name Oligochaetochilus mystacinus. The description was published in the journal The Orchadian from a specimen found on Mount Moffat near the Carnarvon National Park. In the same year, Jasmine Janes and Marco Duretto changed the name to Pterostylis mystacina. The specific epithet (mystacina) is derived from the Ancient Greek word mystax meaning "hair on the upper lip".
