= Derby railway station, Tasmania =

Railway station in Tasmania, Australia

Coordinates: 41°07′42″N 147°47′14″E

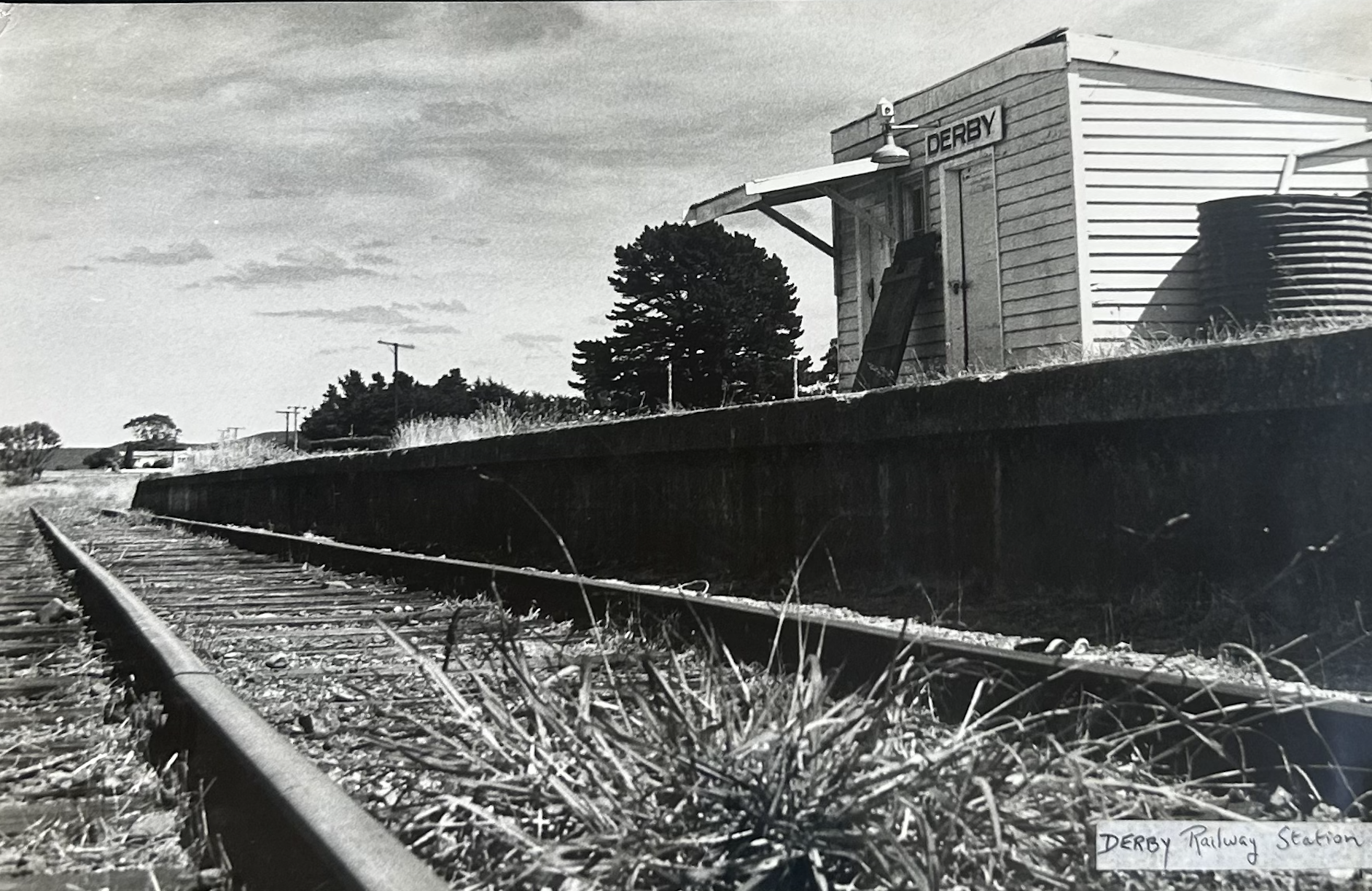
Derby Station in 1976

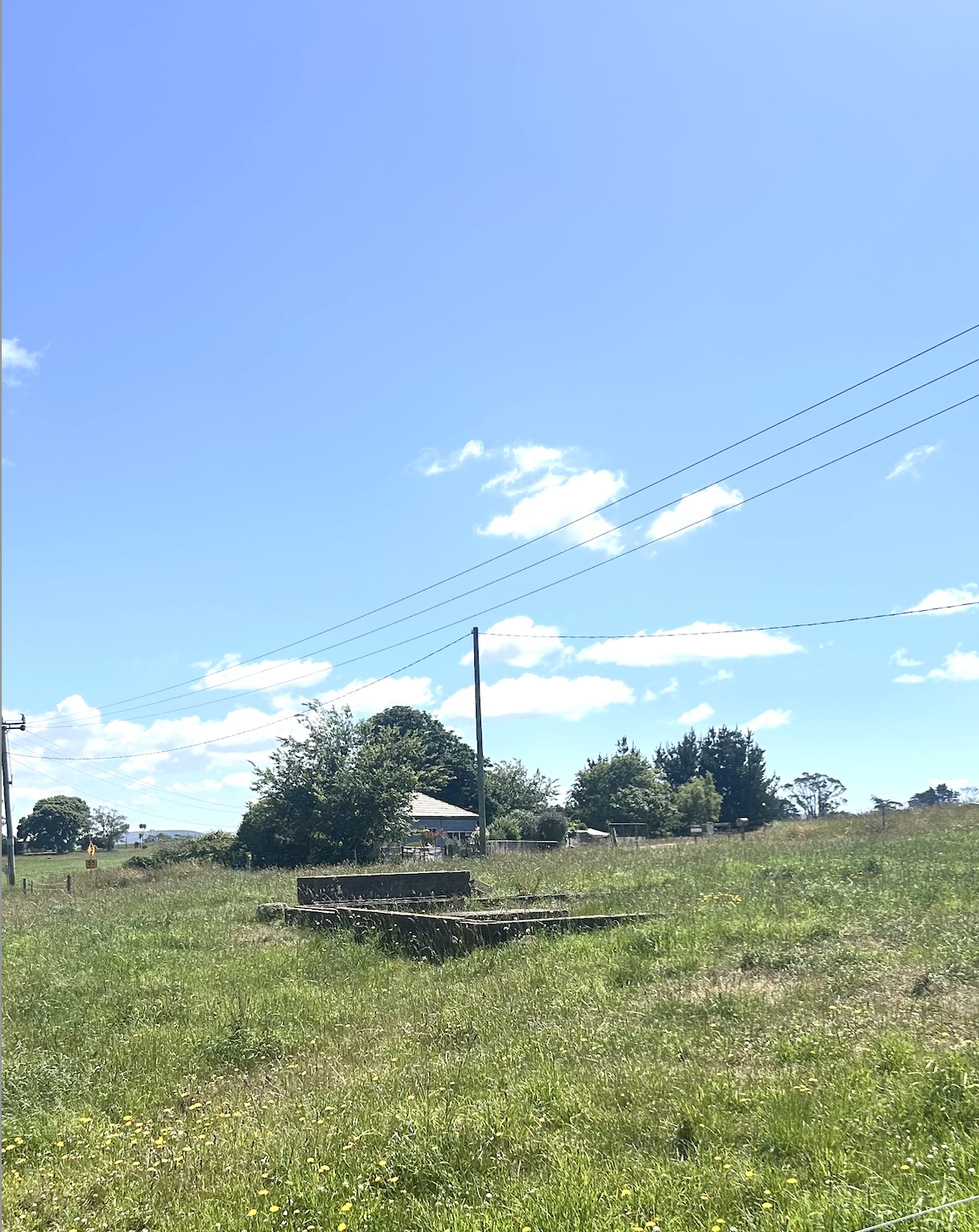
Remains of 1919 Station House at Derby Station

Derby railway station was a station on the Scottsdale Line from Launceston to Herrick in north-eastern Tasmania, Australia. The station opened on 15 March 1919 and carried mainly timber and agricultural freight.

== History ==
In 1889, Tasmanian Government Railways opened a branch line from the Launceston and Western Railway Station. The line ran initially to Scottsdale passing through twelve stations. In 1911, the line extended to Branxholm. In March 1915, a meeting was held in Derby to consider the desirability of a railway station. On 15 March 1919, the line from Branxholm to Herrick via Derby was opened. Trains carried passengers and freight, with passenger services ceasing in 1978. Derby Station was closed in 1992 and the railway dismantled, with the entire branch line shutting in 2005.

== Location ==
The station was situated around 1.2 miles (1.9 km) north of the town on Station Road. Remains of the station can be found where Station Road joins Derby Back Road. The platforms now form part of a stockyard, while ruins of the Station House can still be seen in a nearby paddock.
