= Boronia wilsonii =

Scientific classification
- Kingdom: Plantae
- Clade: Tracheophytes
- Clade: Angiosperms
- Clade: Eudicots
- Clade: Rosids
- Order: Sapindales
- Family: Rutaceae
- Genus: Boronia
- Species: B. wilsonii

Binomial name
- Boronia wilsonii (F.Muell. ex Bentham) Duretto
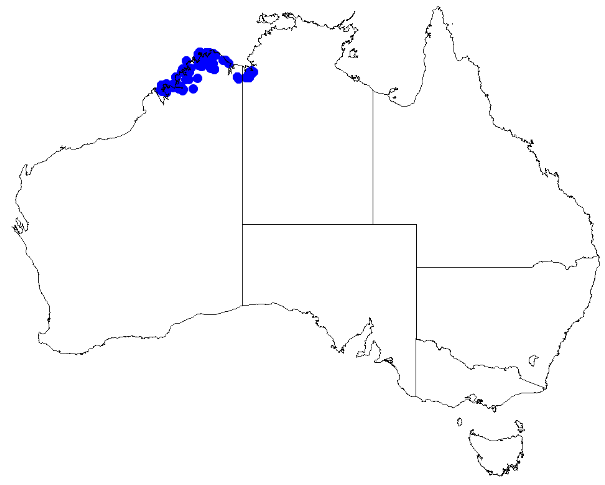
- Occurrence data from Australasian Virtual Herbarium

Species of flowering plant

Boronia wilsonii is an erect shrub that is endemic to northern Australia. Its branches, leaves and backs of the flowers are densely covered with woolly hairs. The petals are white to pink or burgundy-coloured.

== Description ==
Boronia wilsonii is an erect shrub typically growing to a height of 0.3–1.5 mm (0.012–0.059 in). Young plants have a moderately dense covering of woolly, star-shaped hairs on the branches and leaves. Mature plants have a dense covering of woolly, star-shaped hairs on the branches, leaves and backs of the flowers. The leaves are pinnate, 17–34 mm (0.67–1.34 in) long with between thirteen and twenty-three leaflets, each leaflet elliptic to lance-shaped, 1.5–23 mm (0.059–0.906 in) long and 1–6 mm (0.039–0.236 in) wide on a petiole 0.5–7 mm (0.020–0.276 in) long. The flowers are usually borne singly, on a pedicel 2.5–7 mm (0.1–0.3 in) long. The sepals are longer and wider than the petals, egg-shaped to triangular, 5–10 mm (0.20–0.39 in) long, 2–2–4.5 mm (0.08–0.08–0.2 in) wide and densely hairy on their backs. The petals are white to pink or burgundy-coloured, 4–6 mm (0.16–0.24 in) long and both the sepals and petals enlarge as the fruit develops. Flowering occurs between January and September and the fruit is a hairy capsule 4.5–6 mm (0.18–0.24 in) long and 2–2.5 mm (0.079–0.098 in) wide.

== Taxonomy and naming ==
This boronia was first formally described in 1863 by George Bentham from an unpublished description by Ferdinand von Mueller who gave it the name Boronia artemisiifolia var. wilsonii and published the description in Flora Australiensis. In 1997, Marco Duretto raised the variety to species status as Boronia wilsonii. The specific epithet (wilsonii) honours an early collector of the species, possibly geologist James Spottiswoode Wilson who participated, along with Mueller, in Augustus Charles Gregory's 1855-1856 expedition to the northern interior.

== Distribution and habitat ==
Boronia wilsonii is common in the Kimberley region and nearby islands where it grows mostly in near-coastal areas in sandy soil over sandstone. There are also a few collections from the lower Victoria River in the Northern Territory.

== Conservation status ==
This species is classified as "not threatened" by the Western Australian Government Department of Parks and Wildlife and as "near threatened" under the Territory Parks and Wildlife Conservation Act 2000.
