= Pterostylis parva =

Fawn snail orchid

Scientific classification
- Kingdom: Plantae
- Clade: Tracheophytes
- Clade: Angiosperms
- Clade: Monocots
- Order: Asparagales
- Family: Orchidaceae
- Subfamily: Orchidoideae
- Tribe: Cranichideae
- Genus: Pterostylis
- Species: P. parva

Binomial name
- Pterostylis parva D.L.Jones & C.J.French

Species of orchid

Pterostylis parva, commonly known as the fawn snail orchid, is a species of orchid endemic to the south-west of Western Australia. As with similar greenhoods, the flowering plants differ from those which are not flowering. The non-flowering plants have a small rosette of leaves flat on the ground but the flowering plants have a single flower with leaves on the flowering spike. In this species, the flower is small, fawn, green and white and is similar to P. timothyi but smaller in stature.

== Description ==
Pterostylis parva is a terrestrial, perennial, deciduous, herb with an underground tuber and when not flowering, a rosette of small bluish green leaves. The rosette is 10–25 mm (0.4–1 in) in diameter. Flowering plants have a single fawn, green and white flower 10–13 mm (0.4–0.5 in) long and 3–5 mm (0.1–0.2 in) wide on a flowering stem 35–100 mm (1–4 in) high. There are one or two stem leaves 3–6 mm (0.1–0.2 in) long and 2–3 mm (0.08–0.1 in) wide on the flowering stem. The dorsal sepal and petals are fused, forming a hood or "galea" over the column and the dorsal sepal has a short point. The lateral sepals are held closely against the galea, 10–17 mm (0.4–0.7 in) long and have relatively thick, erect tips. The labellum is small and not visible from outside the flower. Flowering occurs from June to early August.

== Taxonomy and naming ==
Pterostylis parva was first formally described in 2015 by David Jones and Christopher French from a specimen collected in the Truslove Nature Reserve near Grass Patch and the description was published in Australian Orchid Review. The specific epithet (parva) is a Latin word meaning "little".

== Distribution and habitat ==
The fawn snail orchid grows in shrubland and woodland between Southern Cross and Israelite Bay.

== Conservation ==
Pterostylis parva is listed as "not threatened" by the Government of Western Australia Department of Parks and Wildlife.
