= Zieria whitei =

Scientific classification
- Kingdom: Plantae
- Clade: Tracheophytes
- Clade: Angiosperms
- Clade: Eudicots
- Clade: Rosids
- Order: Sapindales
- Family: Rutaceae
- Genus: Zieria
- Species: Z. whitei

Binomial name
- Zieria whitei J.A.Armstr. ex Duretto & P.I.Forst.

Species of shrub

Zieria whitei is a plant in the citrus family Rutaceae and is endemic to a small area of north Queensland. It is a dense, compact shrub with erect wiry branches, three-part leaves and groups of up to three white to pale pink flowers with four petals and four stamens. It is only known from two populations.

== Description ==
Zieria whitei is a dense compact shrub which grows to a height of 0.5 m (2 ft) and has erect, wiry branches which are more or less hairy when young. The leaves are composed of three narrow elliptic to narrow egg-shaped leaflets with the narrower end towards the base, 5–10 mm (0.2–0.4 in) long and 1–3 mm (0.04–0.1 in) wide with a petiole 1 mm (0.04 in) long or less. The upper surface of the leaves may have a few hairs but the lower surface is moderately densely hairy. The flowers are white or pale pink and are mostly arranged in groups of three in leaf axils, each flower on a hairy stalk 3–14 mm (0.1–0.6 in) long. The groups of flowers are usually longer than the leaves. The sepals are egg-shaped to triangular, about 2 mm (0.08 in) long and 1–2 mm (0.04–0.08 in) wide. The four petals are white to pale pink, elliptic in shape, about 3 mm (0.1 in) long, 1.5 mm (0.06 in) wide, with the outer surface densely covered with soft hairs. and the four stamens are about 1 mm (0.04 in) long. Flowering occurs between May and July and is followed by fruits which are glabrous capsules, about 3.5 mm (0.1 in) long and 2 mm (0.08 in) wide.

== Taxonomy and naming ==
This zieria was first formally described in 1942 by Cyril Tenison White who gave it the name Zieria aspalathoides var. intermedia and published the description in Proceedings of the Royal Society of Queensland. In 2002, James Armstrong raised the variety to species status, giving it the name Zieria whitei but did not publish the change. In 2007 Marco Duretto and Paul Irwin Forster published the new name and retained White's type specimen as the type of the new species. The specific epithet (whitei) was the name given by Armstrong to honour Cyril White, "who named a number of new taxa of Zieria."

== Distribution and habitat ==
This zieria grows among heathy shrubs and in woodland near Ravenshoe and Atherton in the Einasleigh Uplands biogeographic region.
