= Scottsdale Line =

Railway line in Tasmania, Australia

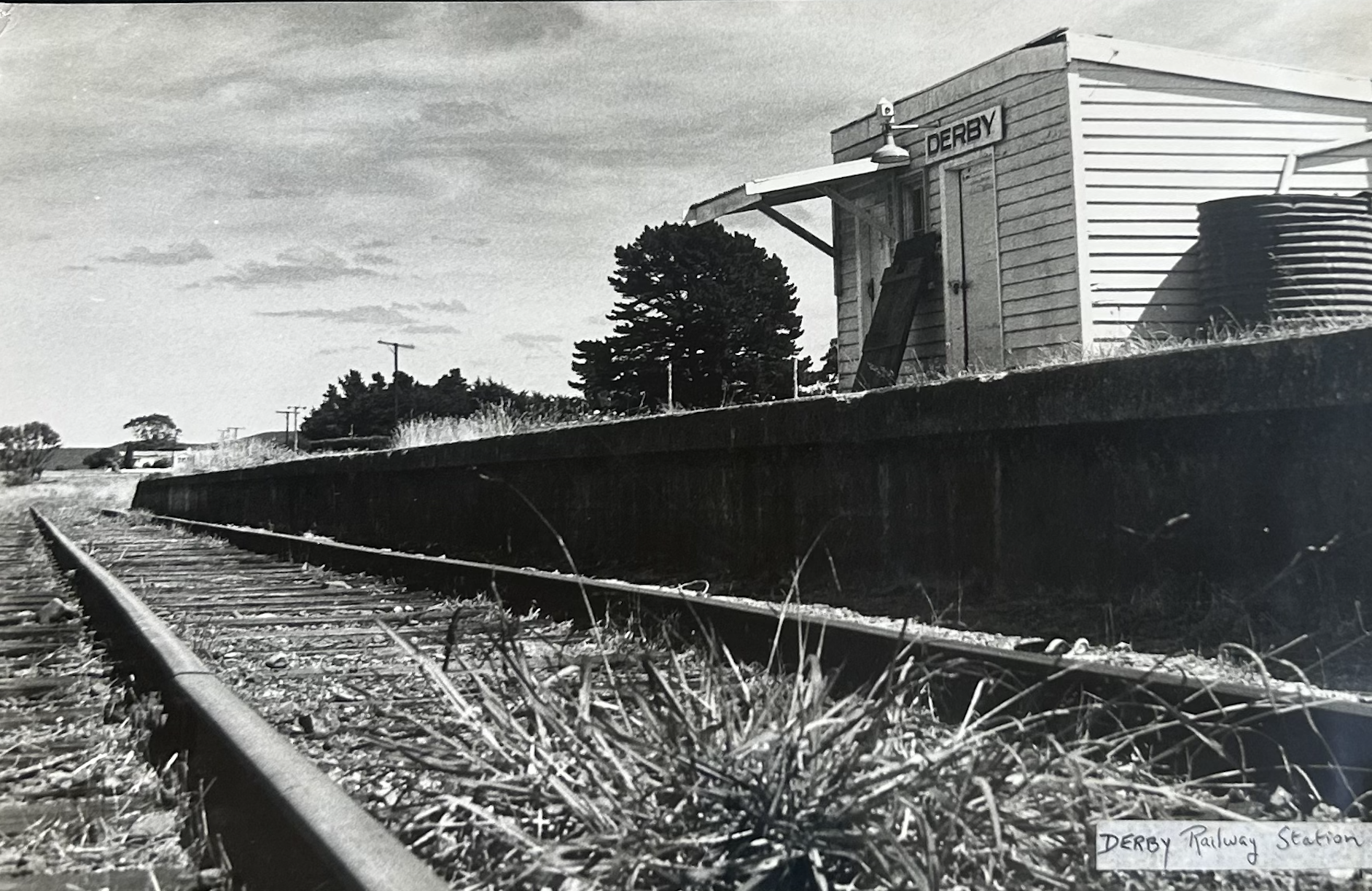
Derby Station, Tasmania in 1976

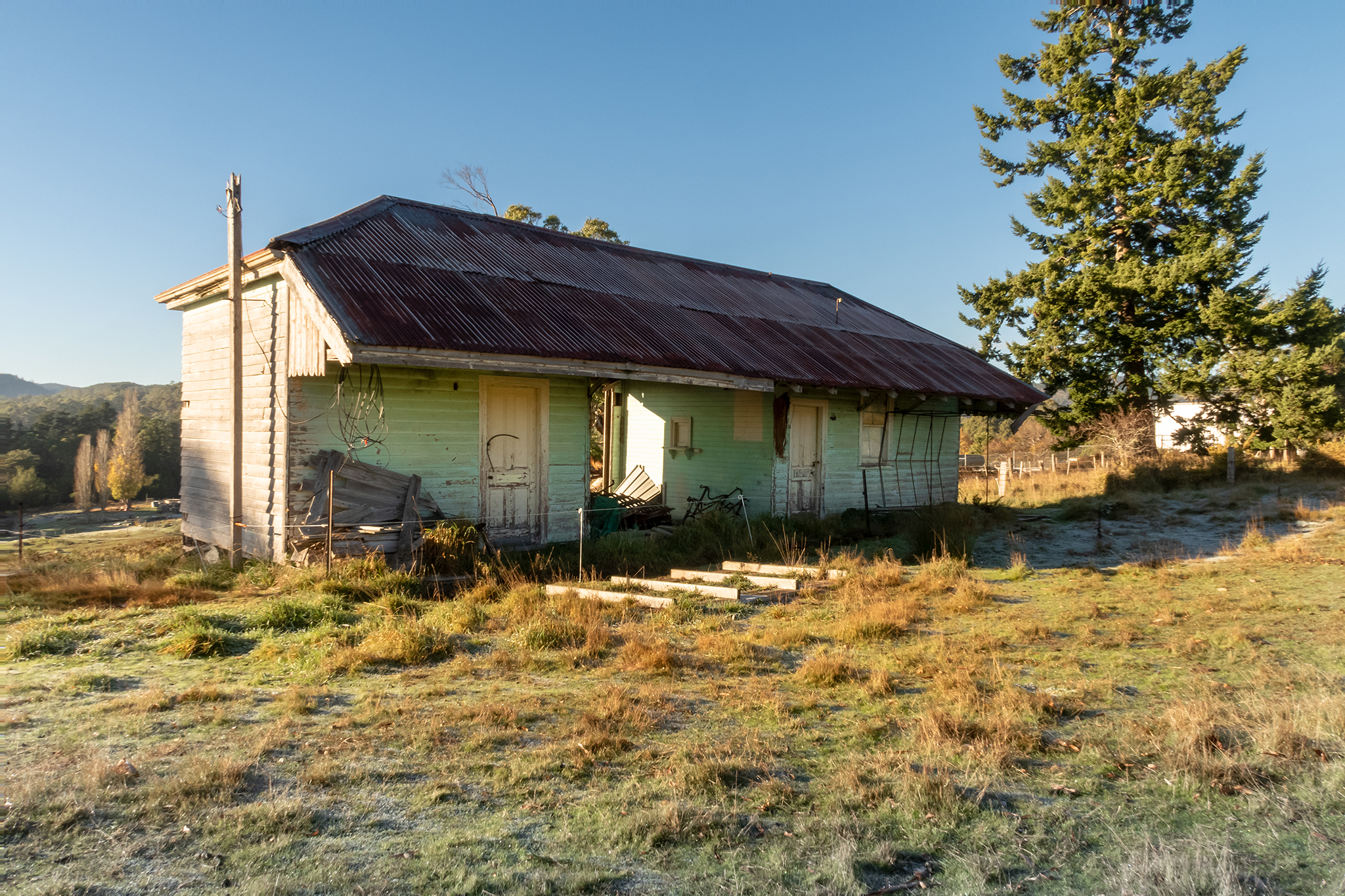
Station building, Branxholm

The Scottsdale Line was a railway branch line which ran between Launceston and Herrick in Northeastern Tasmania.

== History ==
On 9 August 1889, Tasmanian Government Railways opened a branch line from Launceston to Scottsdale. The line branched off from the Bell Bay Line at Coldwater Creek Junction 8 miles (13km) north of Launceston. The line ran initially to Scottsdale passing through twelve stations. The railway was formally opened by Tasmanian Governor, Robert George Hamilton who rode the first train to Scottsdale via Lilydale. The line was 47 miles and one chain in length and cost £395,800 to build.

The contractor was Robert Steele Scott, junior partner of Martin Boland of Underwood. Scott needed to raise £5000 to tender and may have used the relationship with Boland to raise this. At the time of construction, the railway required £80,000 a year to keep it running.

In 1911, the line extended to Branxholm. In 1919, a further extension took the line to Herrick via Derby Station. Trains carried passengers and freight, with passenger services ceasing in 1978. From the 1970s onwards, stations began to close and the railway dismantled, with the entire branch line shutting in 2005.

A recreational walking and biking trail follows the original trackbed from Scottsdale to Tulendeena.

== Route ==
1889-1907: Trains set off from the Launceston and Western Railway Station and passed the following stations: Mowbray (later Mowbray Junction), Rocher's Lane, Turner's Marsh, Karoola, Lilydale, Tunnel, Lebrina, Denison Gorge, Wyena, Golconda, Lisle Road (now Nabowla), Lietinna, Scottsdale.

1907: In 1907, a branch line was constructed from Mowbray Station to Mowbray Racecourse and the station was renamed Mowbray Junction

1911: Tonganah, Trewalla, Kamona, Tulendeena, Legerwood, Branxholm

1919: Mara (later Warrentinna), Ayr (later Telita), Derby, Herrick.

== Construction ==
Boland and Scott offered the lowest tender for the work. The tunnel between Lilydale and Lebrina was 770 yards long and lined with concrete 18 inches thick. The tunnel arches required around 1 million bricks. Building commenced 18 January 1887 and the line to Scottsdale took 2 years and 7 months to complete. The extension to Branxholm was known informally as "Braddon's Folly" as it passed through largely unproductive land that was owned by former Premier of Tasmania, Edward Braddon. The extension was opened on 12 July 1911.
