= Pterostylis sinuata =

Northampton midget greenhood

Conservation status
- Endangered (EPBC Act)

Scientific classification
- Kingdom: Plantae
- Clade: Tracheophytes
- Clade: Angiosperms
- Clade: Monocots
- Order: Asparagales
- Family: Orchidaceae
- Subfamily: Orchidoideae
- Tribe: Cranichideae
- Genus: Pterostylis
- Species: P. sinuata

Binomial name
- Pterostylis sinuata (D.L.Jones) Janes & Duretto

Synonyms
- Hymenochilus sinuatus D.L.Jones

Species of orchid

Pterostylis sinuata, commonly known as the Northampton midget greenhood or western swan greenhood, is a species of orchid endemic to the south-west of Western Australia. Both flowering and non-flowering plants have a rosette of leaves lying flat on the ground and flowering plants have up to twenty yellowish-green flowers. It is only known from a small area between Northampton and Kalbarri.

== Description ==
Pterostylis sinuata, is a terrestrial, perennial, deciduous, herb with an underground tuber. It has a rosette of wavy-edged leaves 30–40 mm (1–2 in) in diameter lying flat on the ground. Between two and twenty or more yellowish-green flowers 5–6 mm (0.20–0.24 in) long and wide are arranged on a flowering spike 50–100 mm (2–4 in) high. The dorsal sepal and petals are joined to form a hood called the "galea" over the column. The dorsal sepal is gently curved but suddenly curves downward near the tip and is about the same length as the petals. The lateral sepals turn downwards and are joined for most of their length forming a cup shape. The labellum is small, green and cup-shaped. Flowering occurs from August to early September.

== Taxonomy and naming ==
The Northampton midget greenhood was first formally described in 2009 by David Jones from a specimen collected near Port Gregory. It was given the name Hymenochilus sinuatus and the description was published in The Orchadian. In 2010 Jasmine Janes and Marco Duretto changed the name to Pterostylis sinuata. The specific epithet (sinuata) is a Latin word meaning "bent" or "curved" referring to the wavy edges of the leaves.

== Distribution and habitat ==
Pterostylis sinuata grows in moist depression, in open areas and flowering reduces when shrubland invades. It is only known from five populations between Northampton and Kalbarri in the Geraldton Sandplains biogeographic region.

== Conservation ==
Pterostylis sinuata is classified as "Threatened Flora (Declared Rare Flora — Extant)" by the Western Australian Government Department of Parks and Wildlife and as "Endangered" (EN) under the Australian Government Environment Protection and Biodiversity Conservation Act 1999 (EPBC Act). The main threats to the species are weed invasion, erosion, road and firebreak maintenance, grazing, inappropriate fire regimes and chemical drift.
