= Boronia amplectens =

Scientific classification
- Kingdom: Plantae
- Clade: Tracheophytes
- Clade: Angiosperms
- Clade: Eudicots
- Clade: Rosids
- Order: Sapindales
- Family: Rutaceae
- Genus: Boronia
- Species: B. amplectens

Binomial name
- Boronia amplectens Duretto

Species of flowering plant

Boronia amplectens is a plant in the citrus family Rutaceae and is only known from two specimens collected from the Arnhem Land plateau in the Northern Territory of Australia. It is a sprawling shrub with narrow elliptic leaves and four-petalled flowers.

== Description ==
Boronia amplectens is a sprawling shrub that grows to 1 m (3 ft) wide. Its branches are covered with star-like hairs. The leaves are narrow elliptic, 15–52 mm (0.6–2 in) long and 1.5–3 mm (0.06–0.1 in) wide with a petiole 0.5–2.5 mm (0.02–0.1 in) long. The flowers are usually arranged singly in leaf axils on a pedicel up to 7–21 mm (0.3–0.8 in) long. The four sepals are larger than the petals, 3–5 mm (0.1–0.2 in) long and 1.5–2 mm (0.06–0.08 in) wide. The four petals are 3–4 mm (0.12–0.16 in) long but increase in length as the fruit develops. Flowering has been observed in March and May and the fruit is a capsule about 4.5 mm (0.2 in) long and 2 mm (0.08 in) wide.

== Taxonomy and naming ==
Boronia amplectens was first formally described in 1997 by Marco Duretto who published the description in Australian Systematic Botany. The specific epithet (amplectens) is derived from the Latin word amplector meaning "encircle", "enfold" or "embrace".

== Distribution and habitat ==
This boronia is only known from two plants growing on the Arnhem Land plateau in the Northern Territory.
