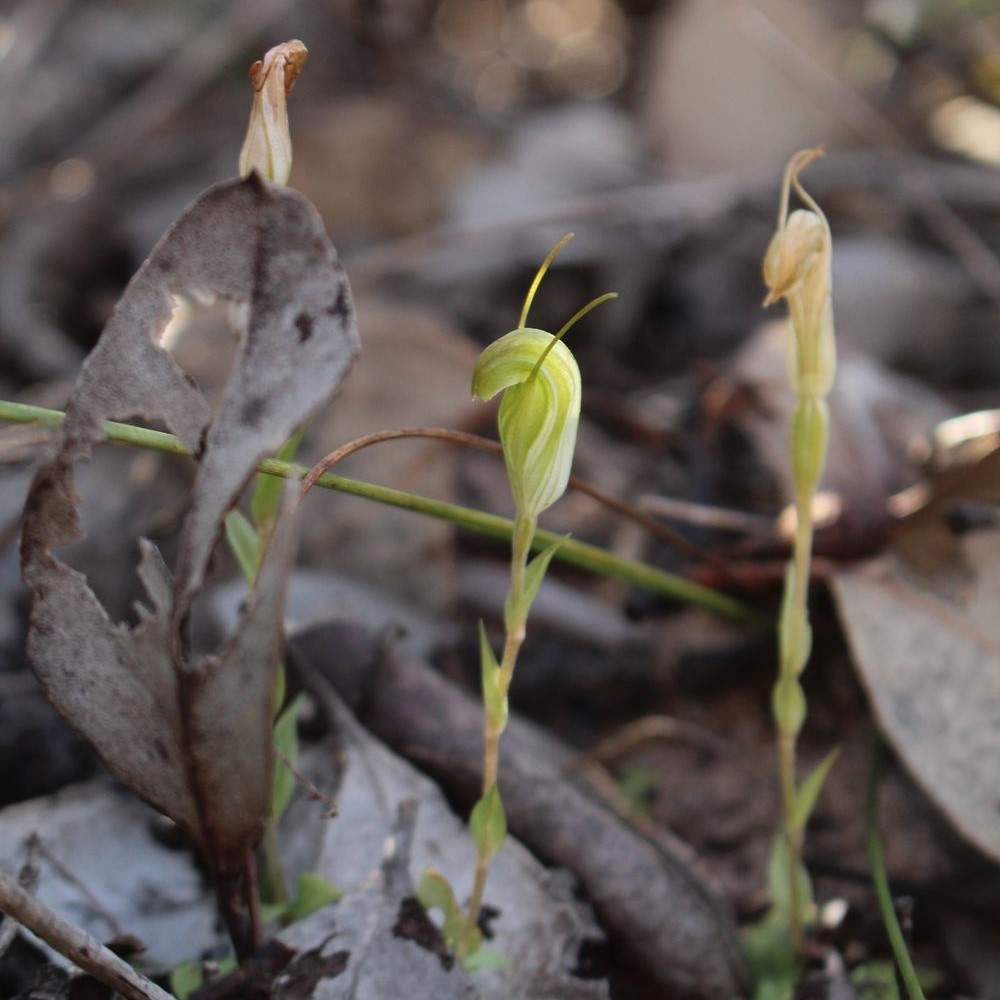

Scientific classification
- Kingdom: Plantae
- Clade: Tracheophytes
- Clade: Angiosperms
- Clade: Monocots
- Order: Asparagales
- Family: Orchidaceae
- Subfamily: Orchidoideae
- Tribe: Cranichideae
- Genus: Pterostylis
- Species: P. timothyi

Binomial name
- Pterostylis timothyi (D.L.Jones) Janes & Duretto

Synonyms
- Diplodium timothyi (D.L.Jones) D.L.Jones & M.A.Clem.; Linguella timothyi D.L.Jones; Pterostylis aff. nana; Pterostylis aff. nana; Pterostylis sp. 'brittle' p.p.; Pterostylis sp. fragile (S.Barrett 553)

= Pterostylis timothyi =

Brittle snail orchid

Species of orchid

Pterostylis timothyi, commonly known as the brittle snail orchid or fawn snail orchid is a species of orchid which is endemic to the south-west of Western Australia. It has a rosette of leaves at its base, and when flowering, a single green, fawn and white with erect lateral sepals.

== Description ==
Pterostylis timothyi is a terrestrial, perennial, deciduous, herb with an underground tuber and a rosette of bright green, pointed leaves 5–11 mm (0.2–0.4 in) long and 4–6 mm (0.16–0.24 in) wide with prominent veins. A single bright green, fawn and white flower, 11–13 mm (0.4–0.5 in) long and 3–4 mm (0.1–0.2 in) wide is borne on a stalk 60–130 mm (2–5 in) high. The dorsal sepal and petals are fused, forming a hood or "galea" over the column, the sepal and petals with a sharp point on the end. The lateral sepals are erect, in close contact with the galea and have thread-like tips 12–18 mm (0.5–0.7 in) long. The sinus between the lateral sepals has a small notch in the centre a brownish central area. The labellum is 3–4 mm (0.1–0.2 in) long, about 2 mm (0.08 in) wide and hidden inside the flower. Flowering occurs in July and August.

== Taxonomy and naming ==
The brittle snail orchid was first formally described in 2006 by David Jones who gave it the name Linguella timothyi. The description was published in Australian Orchid Research from a specimen collected near Jerramungup. In 2010 Jasmine Janes and Marco Duretto changed the name to Pterostylis timothyi. The specific epithet (timothyi) honours Timothy Jones, the son of the author of this species.

== Distribution and habitat ==
The brittle snail orchid grows in woodland and heath between Hyden and Israelite Bay in the Avon Wheatbelt, Esperance Plains, Jarrah Forest and Mallee biogeographic regions.

== Conservation status ==
This species is classified as "not threatened" by the Government of Western Australia Department of Parks and Wildlife.
