= Pterostylis extranea =

Scientific classification
- Kingdom: Plantae
- Clade: Tracheophytes
- Clade: Angiosperms
- Clade: Monocots
- Order: Asparagales
- Family: Orchidaceae
- Subfamily: Orchidoideae
- Tribe: Cranichideae
- Genus: Pterostylis
- Species: P. extranea

Binomial name
- Pterostylis extranea (D.L.Jones) Janes & Duretto

Synonyms
- Oligochaetochilus extraneus D.L.Jones

Species of orchid

Pterostylis extranea is a plant in the orchid family Orchidaceae and is endemic to Queensland. It was first formally described in 2010 by David Jones and given the name Oligochaetochilus extraneus. The description was published in the journal The Orchadian from a specimen grown in the Australian National Botanic Gardens from a tuber collected near Eungella Dam. In 2010, Jasmine Janes and Marco Duretto changed the name to Pterostylis extranea. The specific epithet (extranea) is a Latin word meaning "strange".
