= Lilydale, Tasmania =

Lilydale
- Town
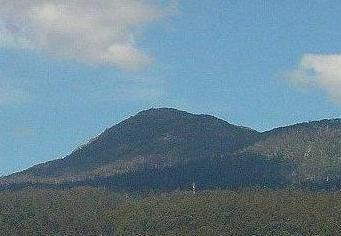
- Mount Arthur, Lilydale

- Coordinates: 41.250°S 147.217°E
- Country: Australia
- State: Tasmania
- LGA: City of Launceston
- Location: 225 km (140 mi) N of Hobart; 28 km (17 mi) NE of Launceston; 40 km (25 mi) SW of Scottsdale, Tasmania

Government
  - State electorate: Bass
  - Federal division: Bass

Population
  - Total: 695 (2021 census)
- Postcode: 7268

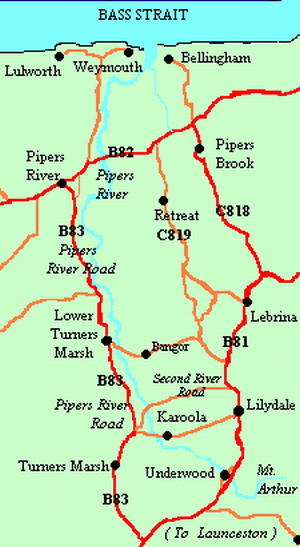
Lilydale Area

Lilydale, formerly known as Upper Piper and later Germantown, is a small town in northern Tasmania, Australia. The town is 28 kilometres (17 mi) northeast of Launceston and is a part of the Launceston municipality, except for about 4% which is in the Dorset LGA. It is located near Mount Arthur. At the 2016 census, Lilydale had a population of 277. The town's notable attractions include the Lilydale Falls, two small waterfalls, Mount Arthur, and, along the main street, a series of telegraph poles painted with murals.

== History ==
The town is believed to have been renamed in 1887, possibly due to the predominance of Christmas lilies in the area.

Speaking at the monthly meeting of the Lilydale council, the clerk stated that during the month he had been asked by scholars at the Lilydale area school the reason why the district was given the name Lilydale, the date the name was altered and who suggested the alteration. Lilydale was formerly known as Upper Piper and the council clerk said he could not supply the information so he wrote to Mr. LW Loewe of Launceston who is an authority on the early history of Lilydale. In his letter Mr. Loewe said the change of name was made in 1887 and the Tankerville Road Trust as the only public body in the district at that time was probably responsible. Mr. E Kowarzić was chairman of the road trust. Mr. Loewe further stated the district was always famous for flowers and at anniversary services there was always a fine display of Christmas lilies in the churches so Mr. E Kowarzić made the remark that the town should be called Lilydale. This was opposed by Mr. John Somerville, Jacob Marx and LW Loewe who favoured 'Tankerville' which is an old English name. One objection made was that there was a Lilydale in Victoria and letters are miscarried. Although it is 67 years since the name was changed letters are frequently sent to the wrong town.

— Minutes of Lilydale Council meeting, as published in the North Eastern Advertiser, 10 November 1944

The Upper Pipers River Post Office opened on 1 December 1873 and was renamed Lilydale in 1887.

Lilydale Railway Station on the Scottsdale Line from Launceston to Scottsdale opened on 9 August 1889. The station closed in the 1970s.

== Facilities ==
Lilydale, Karoola and Turners Marsh are all situated on the North-eastern Railway branch line from Launceston that opened to Scottsdale on 9 September 1889.

As of 2017, Lilydale had an Australian rules football team and a bowls team. It also has a swimming pool open at select times of the year.

More recently, the town has attracted attention due to the Lilydale Village Market, created as a result of mediation between parties in a 2008 environmental dispute.

== Nearby localities ==
=== Karoola ===
Karoola is a small area located off Pipers River Road, about 6 km outside Lilydale town. Karoola means "fresh water" in the local Aboriginal dialect. Facilities in the locality include a telephone box, an emergency fire shed, a Catholic church, a tennis court and a community hall. The local fire station is situated 5 km along Pipers River Road in Turners Marsh. There was once a general store but it was sold to a private buyer.

=== Underwood ===
Underwood is a locality just outside Lilydale. The Pipers River flows through the area.

=== Hollybank Forest ===
Hollybank Forest is a 140-hectare reserve located on the Pipers River, near Underwood, 5 km outside Lilydale. It was originally used to source timber for sawmills in Launceston. Because the land was unable to be farmed the area was taken over by Forestry Tasmania who have managed it since. There are a few short walks and a picnic area.

=== Lower Turners Marsh ===
Lower Turners Marsh is a locality between Lilydale town and Launceston. Lower Turners Marsh is located on Pipers River Road; the area is mostly farms and rural residences. Lower Turners Marsh is sometimes called Karoola.

=== Turners Marsh ===
Turners Marsh is a locality on Pipers River Road, southwest of Lilydale and south of Lower Turners Marsh. Much of the area is bushland, with some small farms. Turners Marsh has a karting track.
