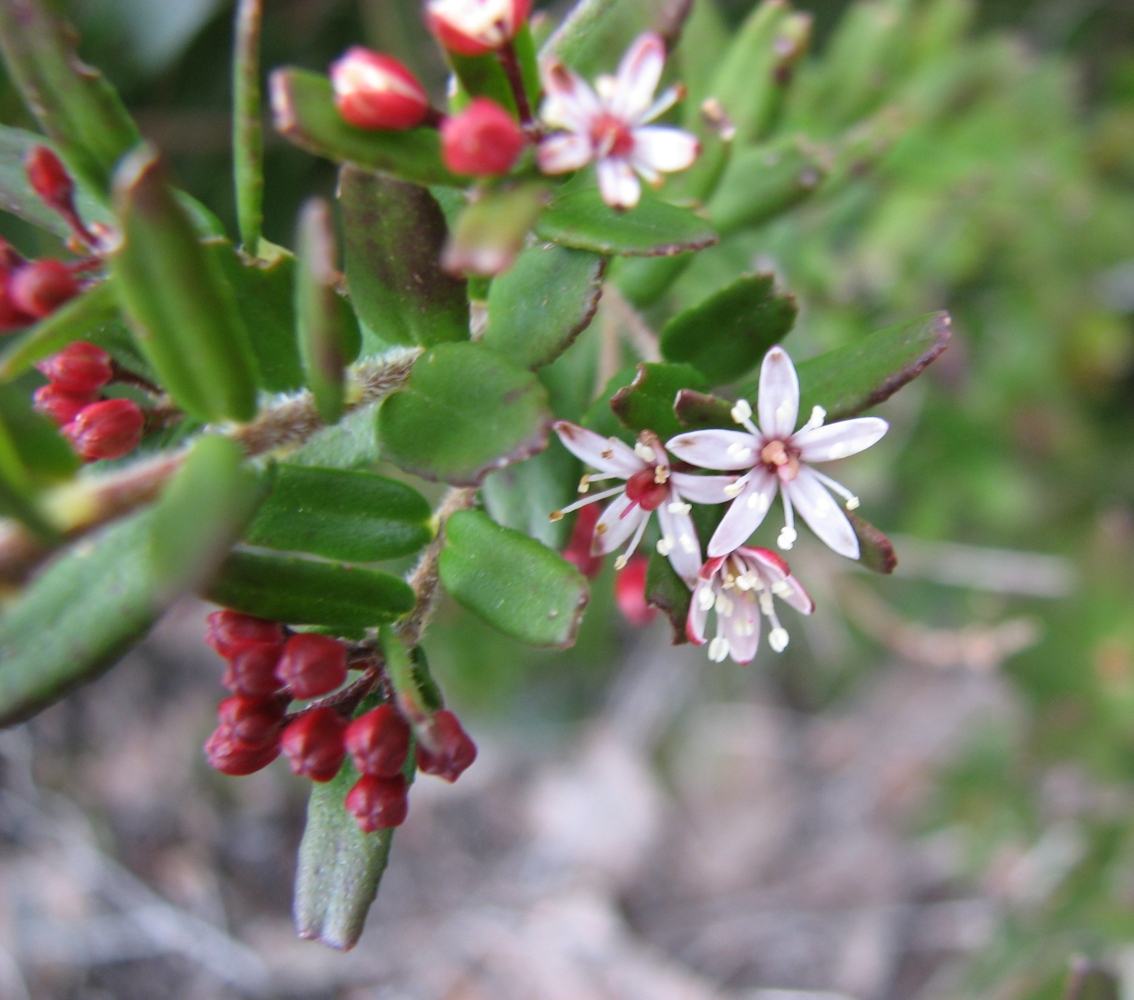
- Leionema bilobum subsp. bilobum in Grampians National Park, Victoria

Scientific classification
- Kingdom: Plantae
- Clade: Tracheophytes
- Clade: Angiosperms
- Clade: Eudicots
- Clade: Rosids
- Order: Sapindales
- Family: Rutaceae
- Genus: Leionema
- Species: L. bilobum

Binomial name
- Leionema bilobum (Lindl.) Paul G.Wilson

Synonyms
- Eriostemon serrulatus F.Muell.; Eriostemon hillebrandii F.Muell. nom. illeg.; Eriostemon hillebrandii var. longifolius F.Muell.; Phebalium bilobum Lindl.; Phebalium truncatum Hook.f.

= Leionema bilobum =

Species of shrub

Leionema bilobum, commonly known as notched phebalium, is a shrub species of the family Rutaceae. It is endemic to south-eastern Australia. The species was first formally described by English botanist John Lindley from material collected during Thomas Mitchell's exploration of the Grampians. His description was published in 1838 in Three Expeditions into the interior of Eastern Australia. Lindley gave it the name Phebalium bilobum. The species was transferred to the genus Leionema by Paul G. Wilson in 2003. Four subspecies were formally described in 2006:

- bilobum — the nominate subspecies from the eastern Grampian Ranges, Victoria.
- serrulatum (F.Muell.) Duretto & K.L.Durham — a long leaved form from Gippsland, Victoria.
- thackerayense Duretto & K.L.Durham — a form with smooth-edged leaves without a bilobed tip. Occurs in the Western Grampians Ranges (including Mount Thackeray) and the Black Range.
- truncatum (Hook.f.) Duretto & K.L.Durham— northern and eastern Tasmania.
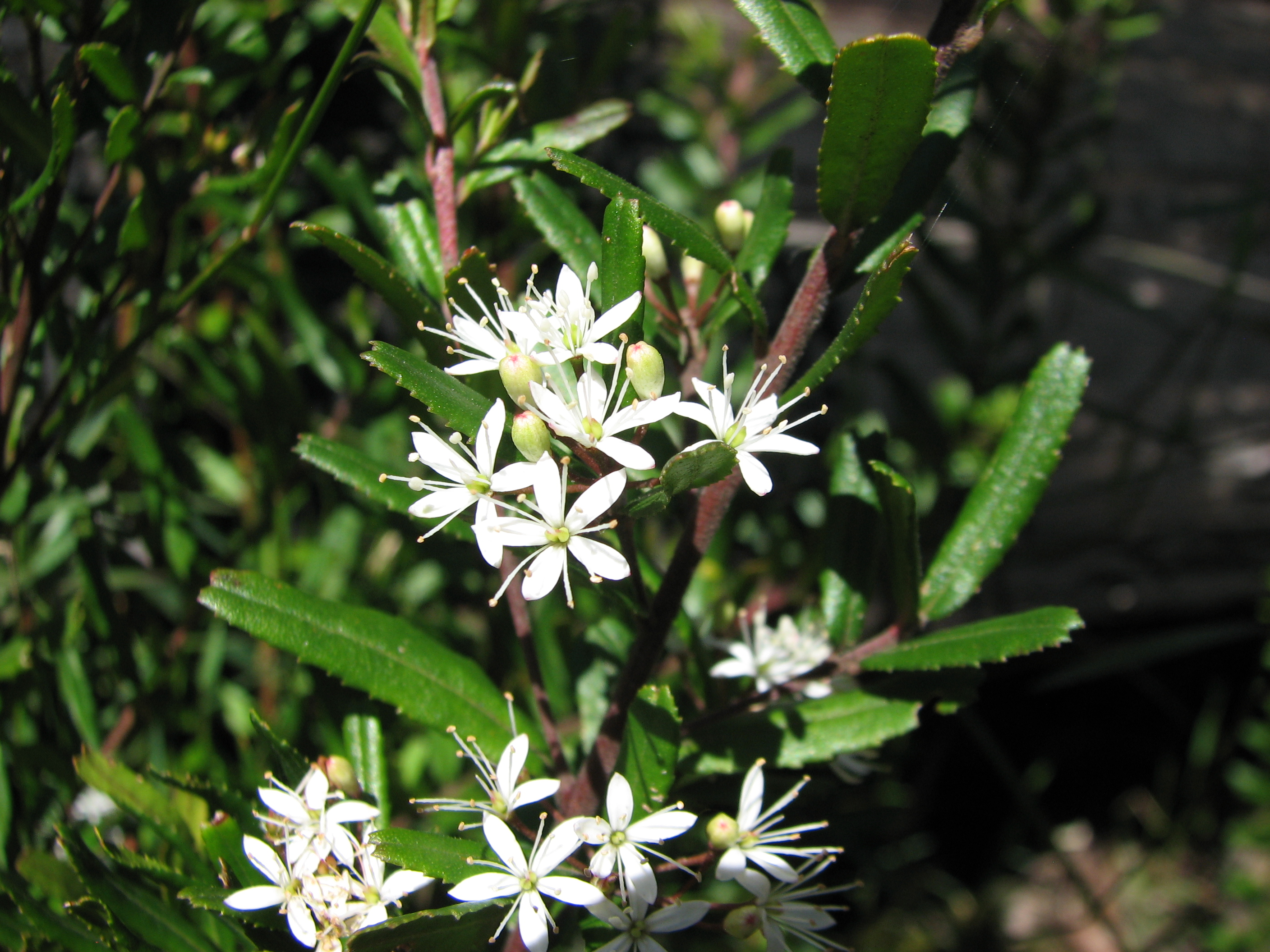
Leionema bilobum subsp. serrulatum
