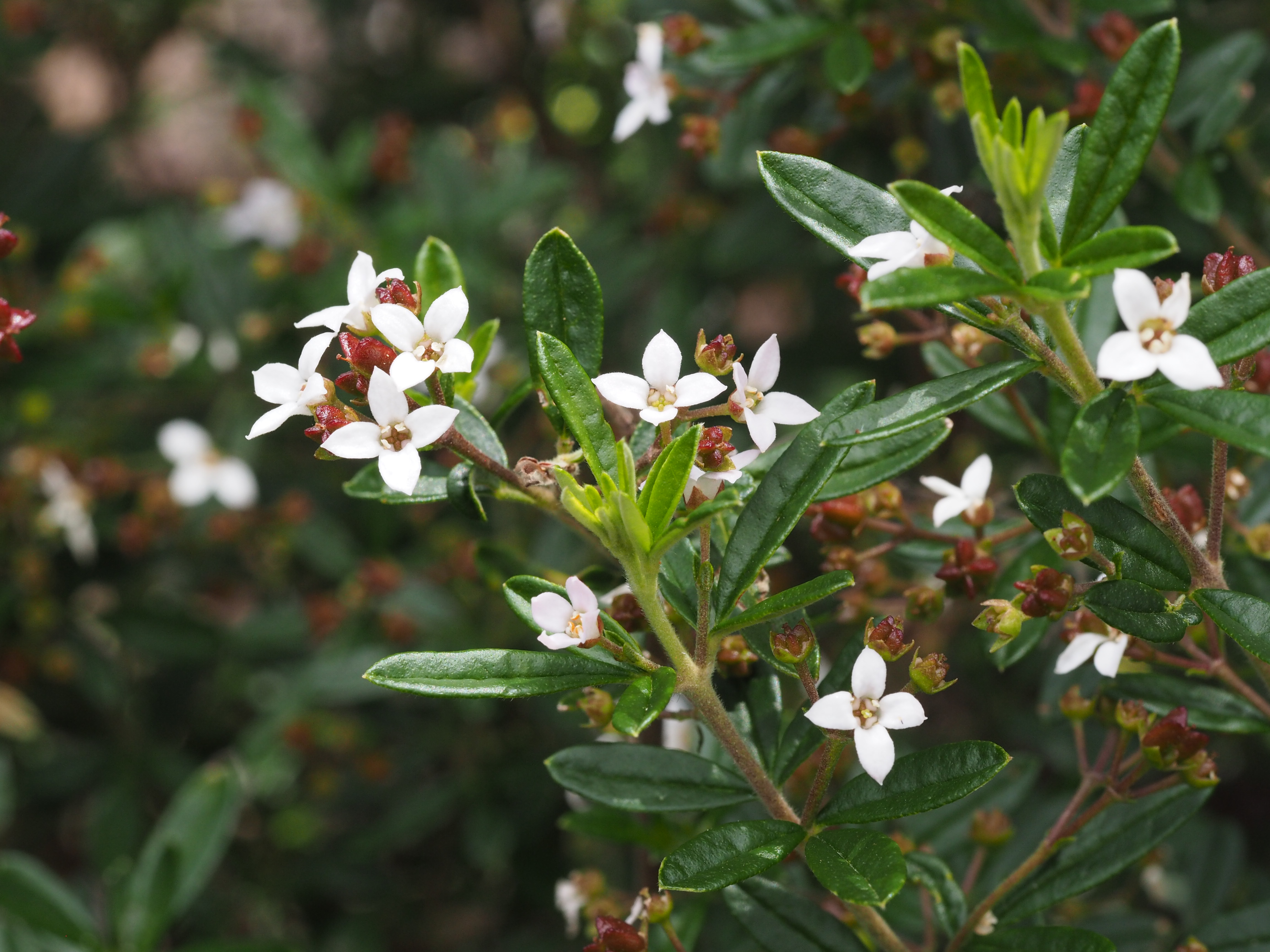
- Leaves, flowers and fruit

Scientific classification
- Kingdom: Plantae
- Clade: Tracheophytes
- Clade: Angiosperms
- Clade: Eudicots
- Clade: Rosids
- Order: Sapindales
- Family: Rutaceae
- Genus: Zieria
- Species: Z. compacta

Binomial name
- Zieria compacta C.T.White

Synonyms
- List: Boronia arborescens F.Muell. nom. illeg.; Zieria compacta C.T.Whitevar. compacta; Zieria fraseri subsp. 'b'; Zieria fraseri subsp. (Messines C.E.Hubbard 3965); Zieria fraseri subsp. B; Zieria fraseri subsp. B; Zieria fraseri subsp. compacta (C.T.White) J.A.Armstr.; Zieria fraseri subsp. compacta (BRI 11370); Zieria smithii var. fraseri F.Muell. ex Maiden & Betche; Zieria smithii var. parvifolia Benth.

= Zieria compacta =

Species of shrub

Zieria compacta is a plant in the citrus family Rutaceae and is endemic to eastern Australia. It is an erect, bushy shrub with leaves composed of three leaflets, and white flowers with four petals and four stamens. It usually grows in rocky places on steep hills.

== Description ==
Zieria compacta is an erect, bushy shrub which grows to a height of about 2 m (7 ft). The branches are smooth and lack obvious glands but are covered with a dense layer of hairs, especially when young. Its leaves are composed of three elliptic to egg-shaped leaflets with the middle leaflet 6–35 mm (0.2–1 in) long and 1.5–8 mm (0.06–0.3 in) wide and the others smaller. The leaf stalk is 2–8 mm (0.079–0.31 in) long. The upper surface of the leaves is glabrous and dark green while the lower surface is a paler green, covered with a thin, dense layer of hairs and has an obvious mid-vein.

The flowers are white to pale pink and are arranged in groups of mostly six flowers (but sometimes as few as one or as many as 35) in leaf axils. The groups are usually about as long as the leaves. The four sepal lobes are about 1.5–2.5 mm (0.06–0.1 in) long and hairy on the outside. The four petals are 2–2.5 mm (0.08–0.1 in) long and in common with other zierias, there are only four stamens. Flowering occurs in spring and is followed by fruit which is a glabrous follicle composed of up to four sections joined at the base and which burst open to release their seeds when ripe.

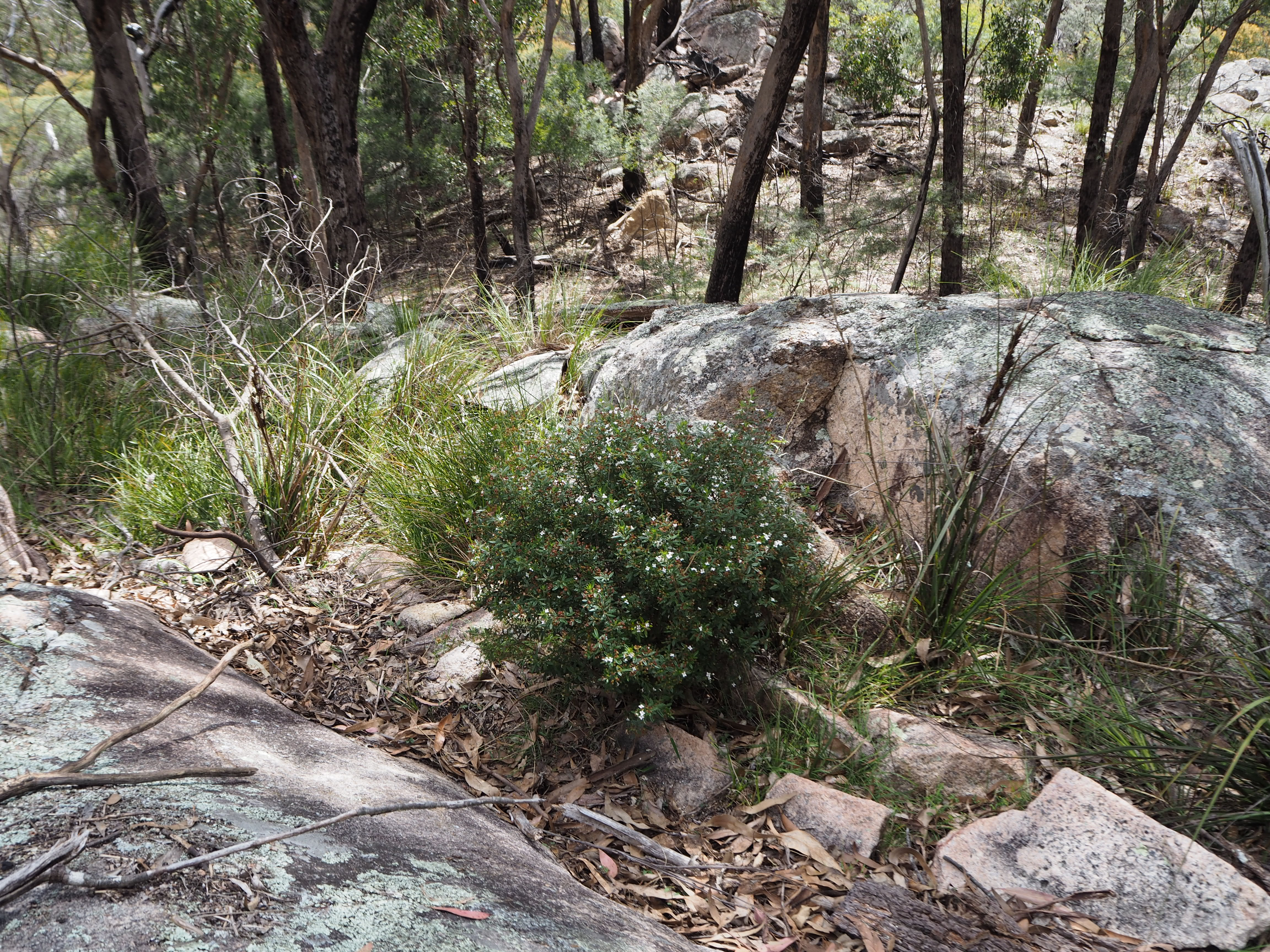
Habit in the Bolivia Hill Nature Reserve near Tenterfield

== Taxonomy and naming ==
Zieria compacta was first formally described in 1942 by Cyril Tenison White in Proceedings of the Royal Society of Queensland from a specimen collected near Stanthorpe. The specific epithet (compacta) is a Latin word meaning "thick" or "firm".

== Distribution and habitat ==
This zieria mainly occurs south from the Darling Downs and Fraser Island in Queensland to the far south coast of New South Wales. It usually grows on steep rocky hillsides in poor soils near granite or sandstone.
