= Mount Arthur (Tasmania) =

Mountain in Tasmania, Australia

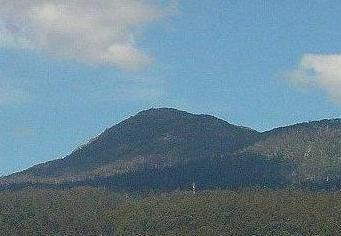
- Mount Arthur, near Lilydale

Highest point
- Elevation: 1,188 m (3,898 ft)
- Prominence: 698 m (2,290 ft)
- Isolation: 15.48 km (9.62 mi)
- Coordinates: 41°16′12″S 147°16′48″E

Geography
- Location within Tasmania
- Location: Northern Tasmania, Australia

Mount Arthur is a mountain in the northern region of Tasmania, Australia. With an elevation of 1,188 metres (3,898 ft) above sea level, the mountain is located north-east of Launceston, near the town of Lilydale.

== Toponymy ==
Mount Arthur had been called Row Tor in the 1800s, although this name also applies on maps to nearby Mount Barrow. Later maps of the north-east show Row Tor as occupying the present day location of Mount Arthur. Row Tor is a homonym of Rough Tor, named for the eponymous mountain in Cornwall, England and not in reference to the mountain's shape, as is commonly supposed.

The first reference to "Mount Arthur" (in north-east Tasmania) in the news appears in 1834, yet references to the same mountain as "Row Tor" continue into the latter half of the century.

Mt Arthur is named for Lt-Governor Arthur, the chief administrator of Tasmania from 1823 and 1837. His tenure was mostly marked by the establishment of administrative and penal institutions. Similarly, Port Arthur, which was a notably gruesome penal settlement, was named after him to recognize his contributions to the colony's development .

== History ==
The summit cairn was built in the late 1800s as a survey marker for north-east Tasmania.

The area around the mountain was an important timber district early in Tasmanian colonial settlement. From 1879, the Lisle valley, on the northern aspect of Mount Arthur, was the centre of gold mining and for twenty years the town of Lisle was a thriving commercial centre. The town no longer exists apart from the remains of the town cemetery.

Due to its close proximity to Launceston its summit is home to a large number of radio towers. WayFM (105.3 and 98.1), Launceston, and Northern Tasmania's Christian community radio station, have their tower on Mount Arthur. There are several amateur radio repeaters installed. It is also a popular destination for hikers.

In addition to this peak, there are two further minor peaks in Tasmania, also called Mount Arthur. One is located near Port Arthur; and the other is located near Hobart.

== See also ==
- List of mountains in Australia § Tasmania
