= Herrick, Tasmania =

Herrick Tasmania
- Coordinates: 41°04′35″S 147°53′06″E
- Population: 52 (2016 census)
- Postcode(s): 7264
- Location: 46 km (29 mi) NE of Scottsdale
- LGA(s): Dorset
- Region: North-east
- State electorate(s): Bass
- Federal division(s): Bass
Localities around Herrick:
Winnaleah	Winnaleah, South Mount Cameron	Pioneer
Winnaleah	Herrick	Pioneer
Winnaleah	Moorina	Moorina

Herrick is a rural locality in the local government area of Dorset in the North-east region of Tasmania. It is located about 46 kilometres (29 mi) north-east of the town of Scottsdale. The 2016 census determined a population of 52 for the state suburb of Herrick.

== History ==
Herrick was gazetted as a locality in 1969.

The area had previously been known as Davids Creek and Nekah.

== Geography ==
The Ringarooma River forms the south-eastern boundary.

== Road infrastructure ==
The Tasman Highway (A3) briefly passes through the southern extremity. Route B82 (Gladstone Road) starts at an intersection with A3 and runs north and east before exiting. Route C839 (Racecourse Road) passes through from west to east.
