= Marco Duretto =

Australian botanist

Marco Fillipo Duretto
- Born: 1964 (age 61–62)
- Scientific career
- Fields: Botany, Rutaceae
- Institutions: National Herbarium of Victoria, University of Tasmania, National Herbarium of New South Wales
- Author abbrev. (botany): Duretto

Marco Duretto (born 1964) is a manager and senior research scientist at the Royal Botanic Gardens Sydney in Australia.

His primary research interests are systematics and conservation of Rutaceae, Rubiaceae, Orchidaceae, Stylidiaceae and evolution of Australasian flora.

Duretto's projects have included "Phylogeny and biogeography of Boronia (Rutaceae)", "Mutual pollination system involving Boronia (Rutaceae) and moths of the Heliozelidae", "A molecular and morphological phylogeny of the Phebalium Group (Rutaceae)", and "East coast species limits in Stylidium".

Marco Duretto was previously a research scientist with the University of Tasmania and before that was manager of plant science at the National Herbarium of Victoria.

== Standard author abbreviation ==
The standard author abbreviation Duretto is used to indicate this person as the author when citing a botanical name.

== Selected published names ==
- Asterolasia exasperata P.R.Alvarez & Duretto
- Asterolasia sola Duretto & P.R.Alvarez
- Boronia amplectens Duretto
- Cyanothamnus acanthocladus (PaulG.Wilson)Duretto & Heslewood
- Drummondita borealis Duretto
- Leionema bilobum subsp. thackerayense Duretto & K.L.Durham
- Pterostylis extranea (D.L.Jones) Janes & Duretto
- Zieria vagans Duretto & P.I.Forst.
- See also Category:Taxa named by Marco Duretto
- and International Plant Name Index: Plant names authored by Duretto

== Selected publications ==
- Barrett, R.L., Barrett, M.D., & Duretto, M.F. (2015) Four new species of Boronia (Rutaceae) from the Kimberley region of Western Australia. Nuytsia, 26; 89-109.
- Barrett, R.A.; Bayly, M.J.; Duretto, M.F.; Forster, P.I.; Ladiges, P.Y.; Cantrill, D.J. (2014). "A chloroplast phylogeny of Zieria (Rutaceae) in Australia and New Caledonia shows widespread incongruence with species-level taxonomy". Australian Systematic Botany. 27 (6): 427. doi:10.1071/SB14033. ISSN 1030-1887. S2CID 86431758. pdf
- Janes, J.K.; Duretto, M.F. (2010). "A new classification for subtribe Pterostylidinae (Orchidaceae), reaffirming Pterostylis in the broad sense". Australian Systematic Botany. 23 (4): 260. doi:10.1071/SB09052. ISSN 1030-1887. pdf
- Janes, J.K.; Steane, D.A.; Vaillancourt, R.E.; Duretto, M.F. (2010). "A molecular phylogeny of the subtribe Pterostylidinae (Orchidaceae): resolving the taxonomic confusion" (PDF). Australian Systematic Botany. 23 (4): 248. doi:10.1071/SB10006. ISSN 1030-1887.
- Duretto, M.F. (2009). 49 Gunneraceae. Flora of Tasmania Online
- Duretto, M.F. (2009) 87 Rutaceae. Version 2009:1, Flora of Tasmania Online
- Downing, T.L.; Ladiges, P.Y.; Duretto, M.F. (2008). "Trichome morphology provides phylogenetically informative characters for Tremandra, Platytheca and Tetratheca (former Tremandraceae)". Plant Systematics and Evolution. 271 (3–4): 199–221. doi:10.1007/s00606-007-0622-2. hdl:11343/34988. ISSN 0378-2697. S2CID 34043304. pdf
- Choia, B.K. & Duretto, M.F. (2008) Correa alba Andrews var. rotundifolia DC.(Rutaceae): an old name for a newly recognised variety endemic to south-eastern Tasmania. Muelleria, 26(2), 45-53.
- Duretto, M.F. & Forster, P.I. (2007) “A Taxonomic Revision of the Genus Zieria Sm. (Rutaceae) in Queensland.” Austrobaileya, vol. 7, no. 3, pp. 473–544. JSTOR
- Duretto, M.F., Durham, K.L., James, E.A., Ladige, P.Y. (2006) New subspecies of Leionema bilobum (Rutaceae). Muelleria 23: 7–14.
- Duretto, M.F. (2003) Notes on Boronia (Rutaceae) in eastern and northern Australia. Muelleria 17 19–135.
- Duretto, Marco F.; Ladiges, Pauline Y. (1998). "A cladistic analysis of Boronia section Valvatae (Rutaceae)". Australian Systematic Botany. 11 (6): 636. doi:10.1071/SB97040. ISSN 1030-1887.
- Weston, P.H & Duretto, M.F. (1999) Boronia fraseri New South Wales Flora Online
