= Leioproctus gaudii =

Scientific classification
- Kingdom: Animalia
- Phylum: Arthropoda
- Clade: Pancrustacea
- Class: Insecta
- Order: Hymenoptera
- Family: Colletidae
- Genus: Leioproctus
- Species: L. gaudii

Binomial name
- Leioproctus gaudii Batley, 2025

Species of bee

Leioproctus gaudii, or Leioproctus (Euryglossidia) gaudii, is a species of bee in the family Colletidae and subfamily Colletinae. It is endemic to Australia. It was described by entomologist Michael Batley in 2025.

== Etymology ==
The specific epithet gaudii refers to the species of plant on which the first specimens were collected.

== Description ==
The female body length is 9.3 mm. Integumental colouration is mainly black. The hair is mostly white to pale brown.

== Distribution and habitat ==
The species occurs in south-eastern Australia. The type locality is Cocoparra National Park in the Riverina region of New South Wales.

== Behaviour ==
The adults are flying mellivores. Flowering plants visited by the bees include Gaudium divaricatum.

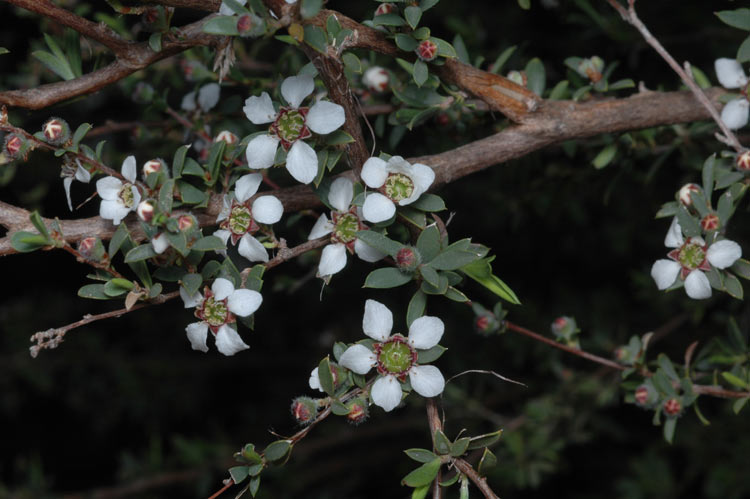
Flowers of Gaudium divaricatum, a forage plant of the bees
