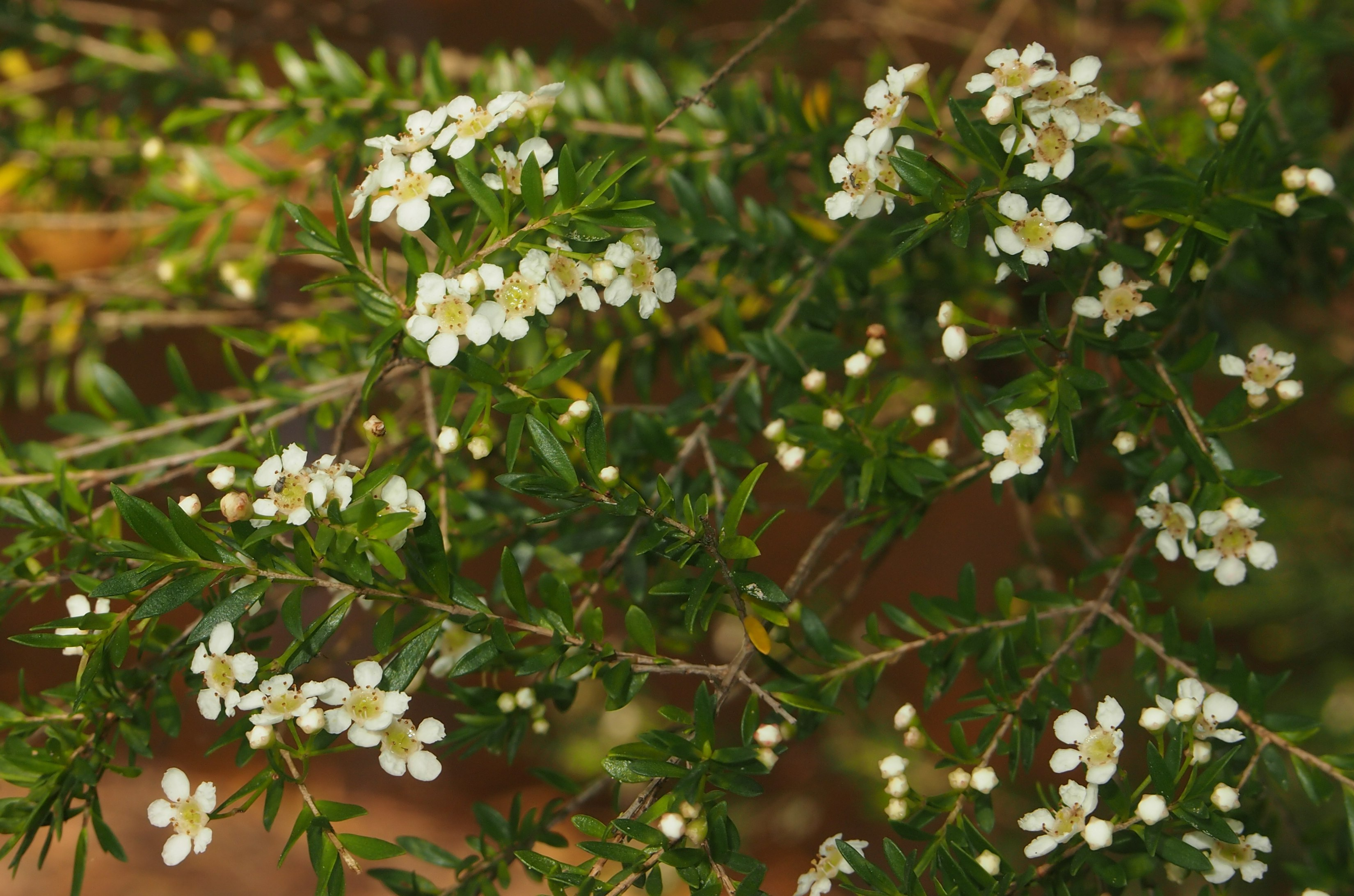
- Near Maryvale

Scientific classification
- Kingdom: Plantae
- Clade: Tracheophytes
- Clade: Angiosperms
- Clade: Eudicots
- Clade: Rosids
- Order: Myrtales
- Family: Myrtaceae
- Genus: Gaudium
- Species: G. neglectum

Binomial name
- Gaudium neglectum (Joy Thomps.) Peter G.Wilson

Synonyms
- Leptospermum neglectum Joy Thomps.; Leptospermum attenuatum var. subsessile C.T.White

= Gaudium neglectum =

Species of flowering plant

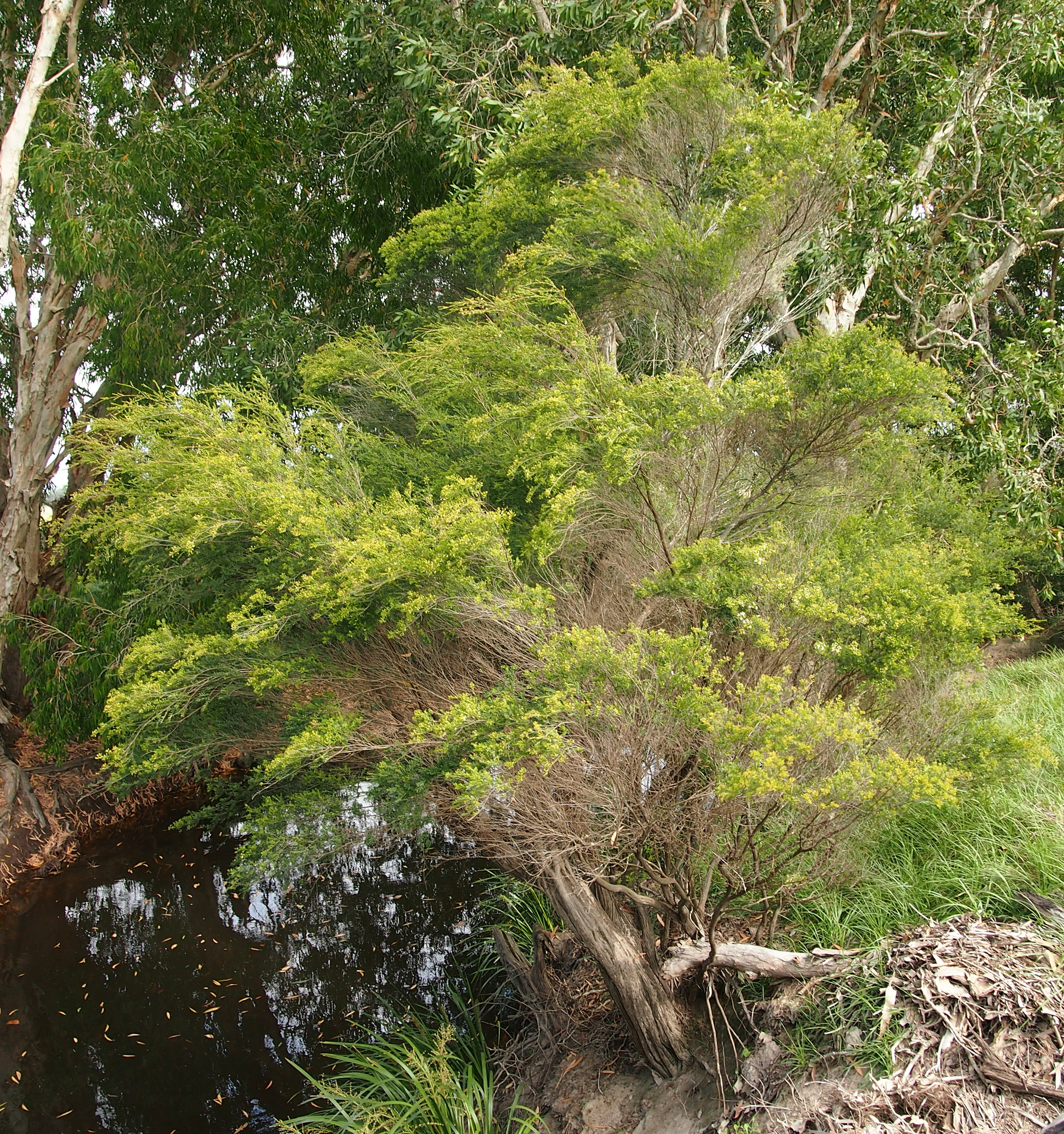
Habit

Leptospermum neglectum is a shrub or small tree that is endemic to Queensland. It has elliptical leaves that are silky-hairy at first, white flowers on short shoots in leaf axils and fruit with the remnants of the sepals attached but that fall from the plant shortly after the seeds are released.

== Description ==
Gaudium neglectum is a shrub that typically grows to a height of 2 m (6 ft 7 in), rarely a tree to 10 m (33 ft). Older stems have thin, fibrous bark, the younger stems often silky-hairy at first. The leaves are elliptical, silky-hairy at first, 10–20 mm (0.39–0.79 in) long and 2–3 mm (0.079–0.118 in) wide tapering to a short petiole. The flowers are usually borne singly on the ends of short side shoots in leaf axils, and are white, 8–11 mm (0.31–0.43 in) wide. There are a few reddish brown bracts and larger bracteoles at the base of the flower bud but all are shed before the flower opens. The floral cup is densely covered with soft, silky hairs and about 3 mm (0.12 in) long. The sepals are about 1 mm (0.039 in) long, the petals about 4 mm (0.16 in) long and the stamens are up to 1 mm (0.039 in) long. Flowering mainly occurs in October and the fruit is a capsule usually 3–4 mm (0.12–0.16 in) in diameter with the remnants of the sepals attached, but which falls from the fruit shortly after the seeds are released.

== Taxonomy and naming ==
This species was first formally described in 1989 by Joy Thompson who gave it the name Leptospermum neglectum in the journal Telopea, based on plant material collected in 1982 by Cyril Tenison White near Paluma. White considered it to be a variety (var. subsessile) of L. attenuatum, now known as Leptospermum trinervium (Sm.) Joy Thomps. In 2023, Peter Gordon Wilson transferred the species to the genus Gaudium as G. neglectum in the journal Taxon. The specific epithet (neglectum) refers to "the lost opportunities associated with it".

== Distribution and habitat ==
This tea-tree grows in rocky places and on the coast and nearby ranges between Herberton and the Bundaberg district in Queensland.

== Conservation status ==
This species is classified as of "least concern" under the Queensland Government Nature Conservation Act 1992.
