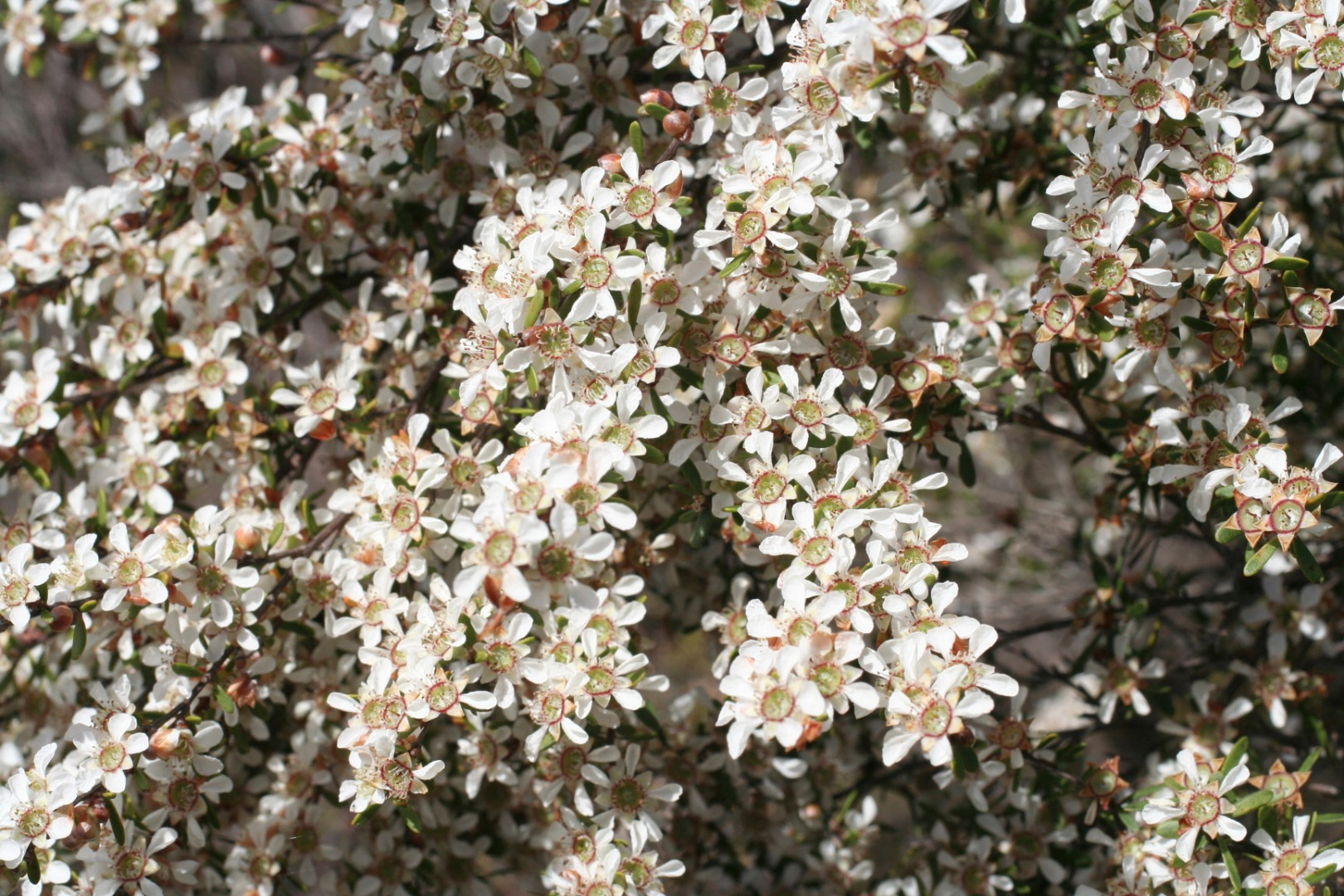
- In Broadwater National Park

Scientific classification
- Kingdom: Plantae
- Clade: Tracheophytes
- Clade: Angiosperms
- Clade: Eudicots
- Clade: Rosids
- Order: Myrtales
- Family: Myrtaceae
- Genus: Gaudium
- Species: G. semibaccatum

Binomial name
- Gaudium semibaccatum (Cheel) Peter G.Wilson

Synonyms
- Leptospermum semibaccatum Cheel

= Gaudium semibaccatum =

Species of flowering plant

Gaudium semibaccatum is a species of low, dense shrub that is endemic to eastern Australia. It has egg-shaped to narrow elliptical leaves with a blunt tip, white or pink flowers and hairy, flat-topped fruit that falls from the plant shortly after the seeds are released. It grows in poorly-drained soil in coastal heath.

== Description ==
Gaudium semibaccatum is a low, dense shrub that typically grows to a height of 0.5 m (1 ft 8 in), sometimes to 2 m (6 ft 7 in). It has thin, flaking bark, the young stems hairy, at least at first. The leaves are egg-shaped to narrow elliptical 5–10 mm (0.20–0.39 in) long and mostly 1.5–2.5 mm (0.059–0.098 in) wide with a blunt tip and tapering at the base to a short petiole. The flowers are white or pink, mostly 5–10 mm (0.20–0.39 in) wide and arranged singly or in pairs on a short side shoot. There are many reddish brown bracts at the base of the flower bud but which mostly fall off before the flower opens. The floral cup is silky-hairy, 3–4 mm (0.12–0.16 in) long, the sepals oblong and about 1.5–2 mm (0.059–0.079 in) long. The petals are 3.5–7 mm (0.14–0.28 in) long and the stamens 1.5–2 mm (0.059–0.079 in) long. Flowering mainly occurs from August to October and the fruit is a flat-topped capsule 4–6 mm (0.16–0.24 in) wide and hairy at first. The fruit are shed soon after the seeds are released.

== Taxonomy and naming ==
This species was first formally described in 1932 by Edwin Cheel who gave it the name Leptospermum semibaccatum in the Journal and Proceedings of the Royal Society of New South Wales, from specimens collected by C.T.White on Moreton Island. In 2023, Peter Gordon Wilson transferred the species to the genus Gaudium as G. parvifolium in the journal Taxon.

== Distribution and habitat ==
This tea-tree grows in sandy soil in poorly drained-coastal heath between Bundaberg in Queensland and Forster in New South Wales.
