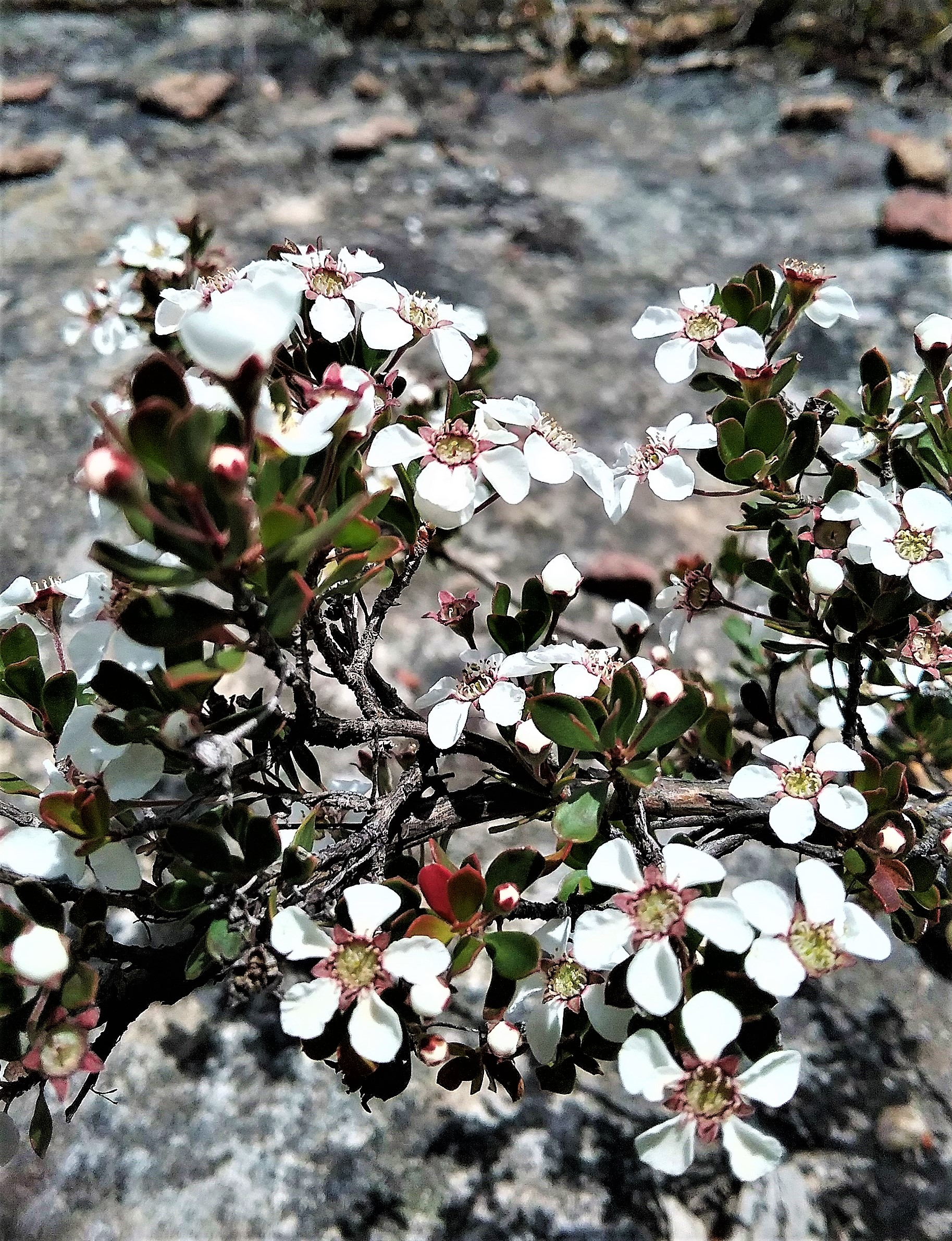
- In the Wolgan Valley

Scientific classification
- Kingdom: Plantae
- Clade: Tracheophytes
- Clade: Angiosperms
- Clade: Eudicots
- Clade: Rosids
- Order: Myrtales
- Family: Myrtaceae
- Genus: Gaudium
- Species: G. blakelyi

Binomial name
- Gaudium blakelyi (Joy Thomps.) Peter G.Wilson
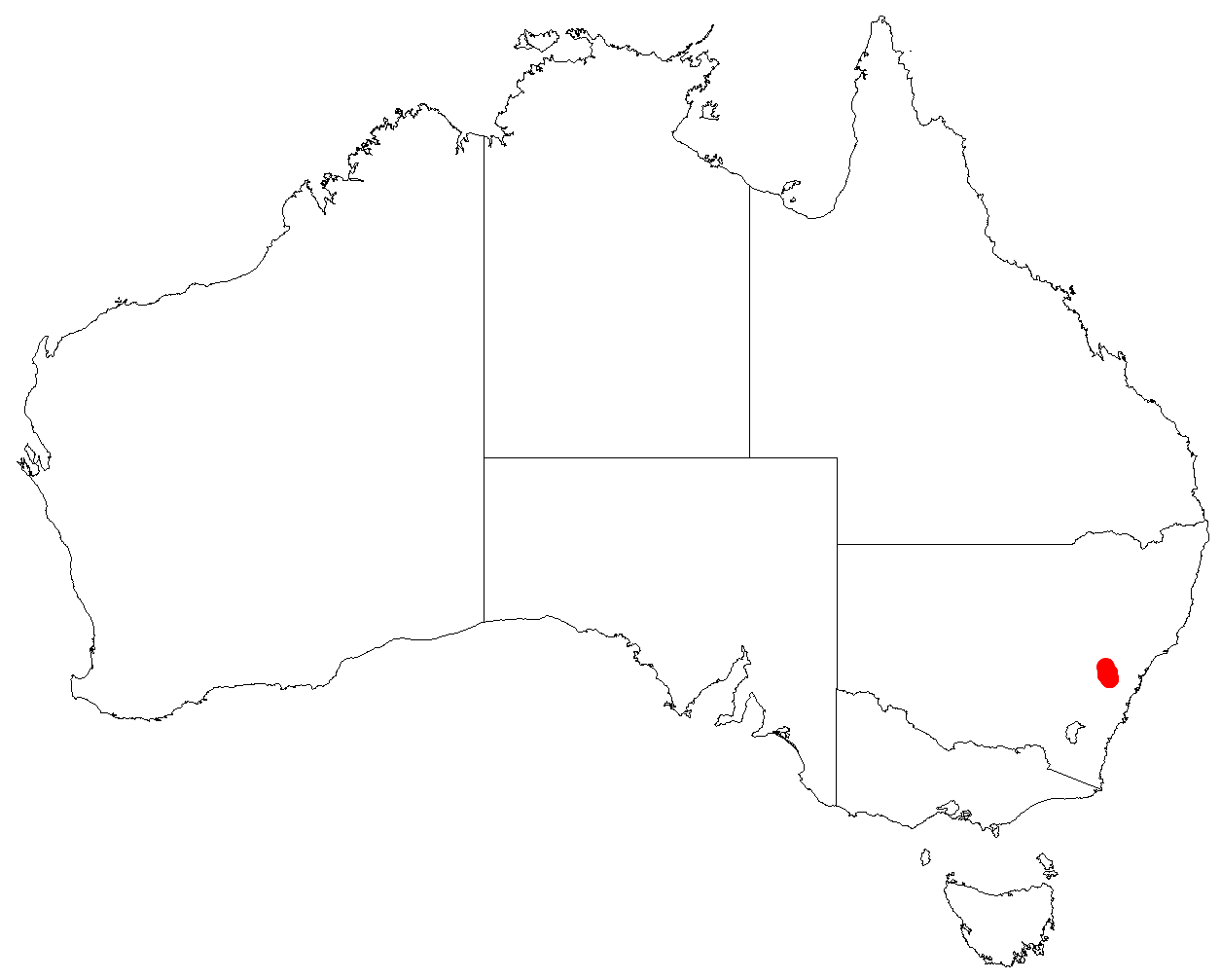
- Occurrence data from AVH

= Gaudium blakelyi =

Australian species of plant

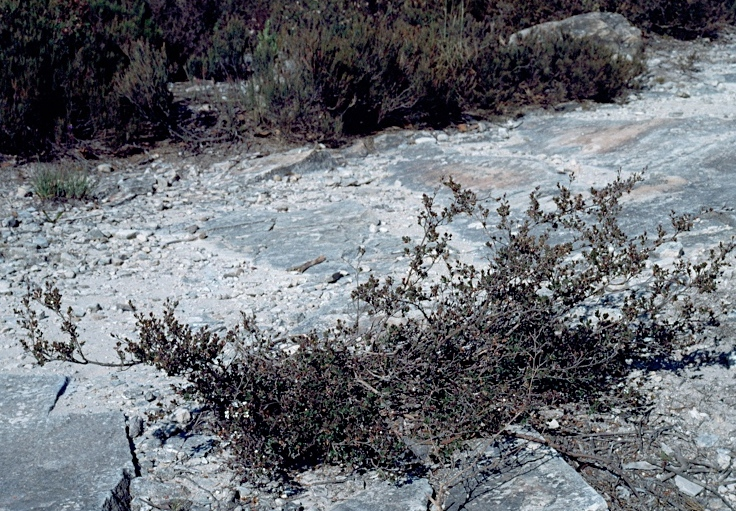
Habit at Hassans Walls, near Lithgow

Gaudium blakelyi is a species of shrub that is endemic to rocky clifftops near Lithgow in New South Wales. It has densely silky young stems, egg-shaped to elliptical leaves and white or pink flowers.

== Description ==
Gaudium blakelyi is a spreading shrub that typically grows to a height of 1 m (3 ft 3 in) and has closely adhering flakes of bark that is shed in fibrous strips. Young stems are densely hairy at first. The leaves are broadly elliptical to egg-shaped, 4–8 mm (0.16–0.31 in) long and 2–5 mm (0.079–0.197 in) wide on a short petiole. The flowers are borne singly or in groups of up to four, usually in leaf axils and are about 7 mm (0.28 in) in diameter on a pedicel 5 mm (0.20 in) or more long. The floral cup is usually densely hairy, about 2 mm (0.079 in) long. The sepals are triangular, 1–1.5 mm (0.039–0.059 in) long and remain attached as the fruit develops. The petals are 2–2.5 mm (0.079–0.098 in) long and white or pink and the stamens are about 1 mm (0.039 in) long. Flowering occurs from November to December and the fruit is a woody capsule 2–3.5 mm (0.079–0.138 in) in diameter on a pedicel 6–8 mm (0.24–0.31 in) long.

== Taxonomy and naming ==
This species was first formally described in 1989 by Joy Thompson in the journal Telopea. In 2023, Peter Gordon Wilson transferred the species to the genus Gaudium as G. blakelyi in the journal Taxon. The specific epithet (blakelyi) honours William Blakely who wrote an unpublished description of this species.

== Distribution and habitat ==
This tea-tree grows on rocky clifftops in heath near Lithgow.
