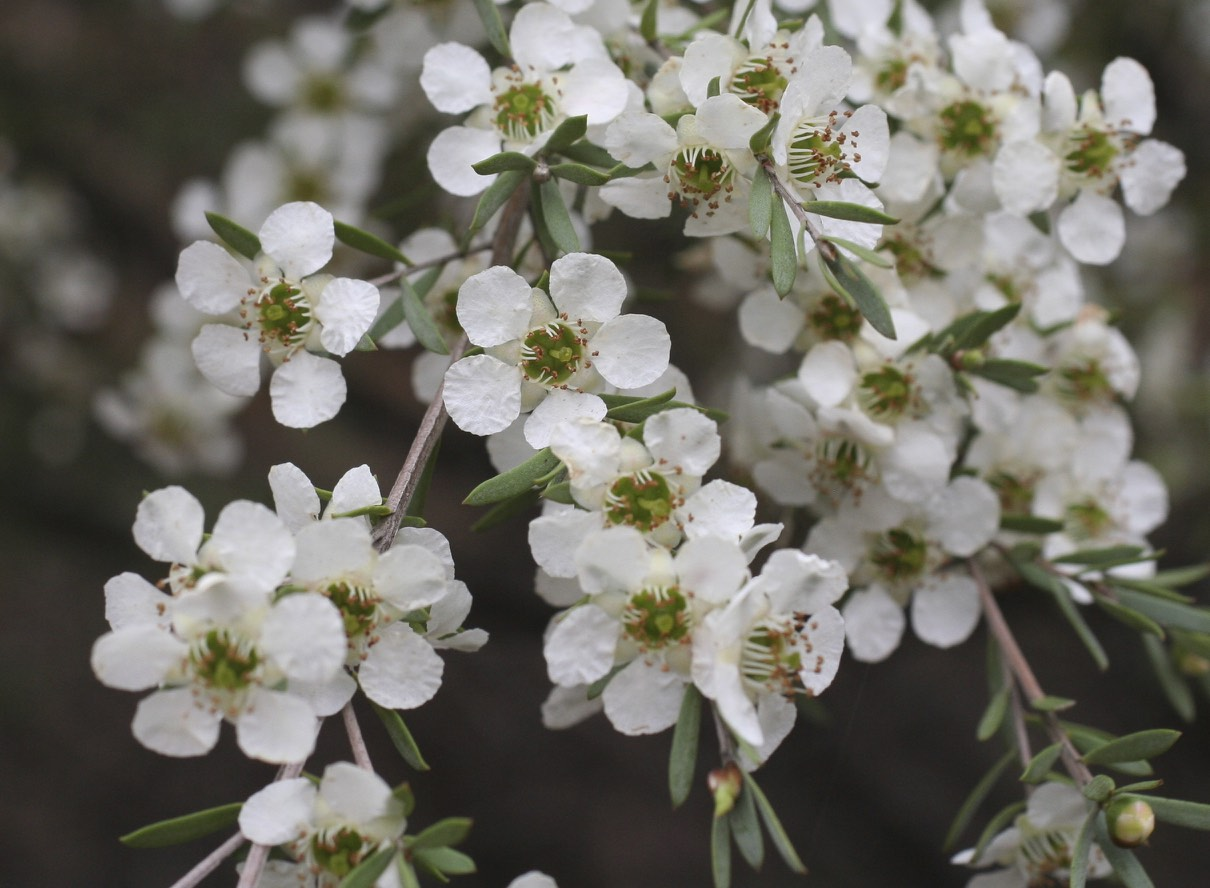
- Near Glenhaughton

Scientific classification
- Kingdom: Plantae
- Clade: Tracheophytes
- Clade: Angiosperms
- Clade: Eudicots
- Clade: Rosids
- Order: Myrtales
- Family: Myrtaceae
- Genus: Gaudium
- Species: G. sericatum

Binomial name
- Gaudium sericatum (Lindl.) Peter G.Wilson

Synonyms
- Leptospermum sericatum Lindl.; Leptospermum stellatum f. sericatum (Lindl.) Domin

= Gaudium sericatum =

Species of flowering plant

Gaudium sericatum is a species of erect shrub that is endemic to Queensland. It has thin, firm bark, narrow egg-shaped to elliptical leaves, white or pink flowers arranged usually singly on side shoots and fruit that falls from the plant when the seeds are released.

== Description ==
Gaudium sericatum is an erect shrub that typically grows to a height of 2–3 m (6 ft 7 in – 9 ft 10 in) and has thin, firm bark, the branchlets usually with flattened silky hairs. The leaves are narrow egg-shaped with the narrower end towards the base, or elliptical, 5–10 mm (0.20–0.39 in) long and 1.5–3 mm (0.059–0.118 in) wide with a short, blunt point on the tip and tapering to a short petiole. The flowers are usually borne singly on side shoots or in leaf axils and are white or pink, about 10 mm (0.39 in) wide. The floral cup is silky-hairy, about 2 mm (0.079 in) long and there are a few broad, thin bracts at the base of the flower, some of which remain until the flowers open. The sepals are thin and pale, 1–1.5 mm (0.039–0.059 in) long, the petals 3–4 mm (0.12–0.16 in) long and the stamens are about 1 mm (0.039 in) long. Flowering occurs from September to October.

== Taxonomy and naming ==
This species was first formally described in 1848 by John Lindley who gave it the name Leptospermum sericatum in Thomas Mitchell's Journal of an Expedition into the Interior of Tropical Australia. In 2023, Peter Gordon Wilson transferred the species to the genus Gaudium as G. parvifolium in the journal Taxon.

== Distribution and habitat ==
This tea-tree usually grows in crevices near sandstone cliffs and occurs in the Leichhardt district in Queensland.
