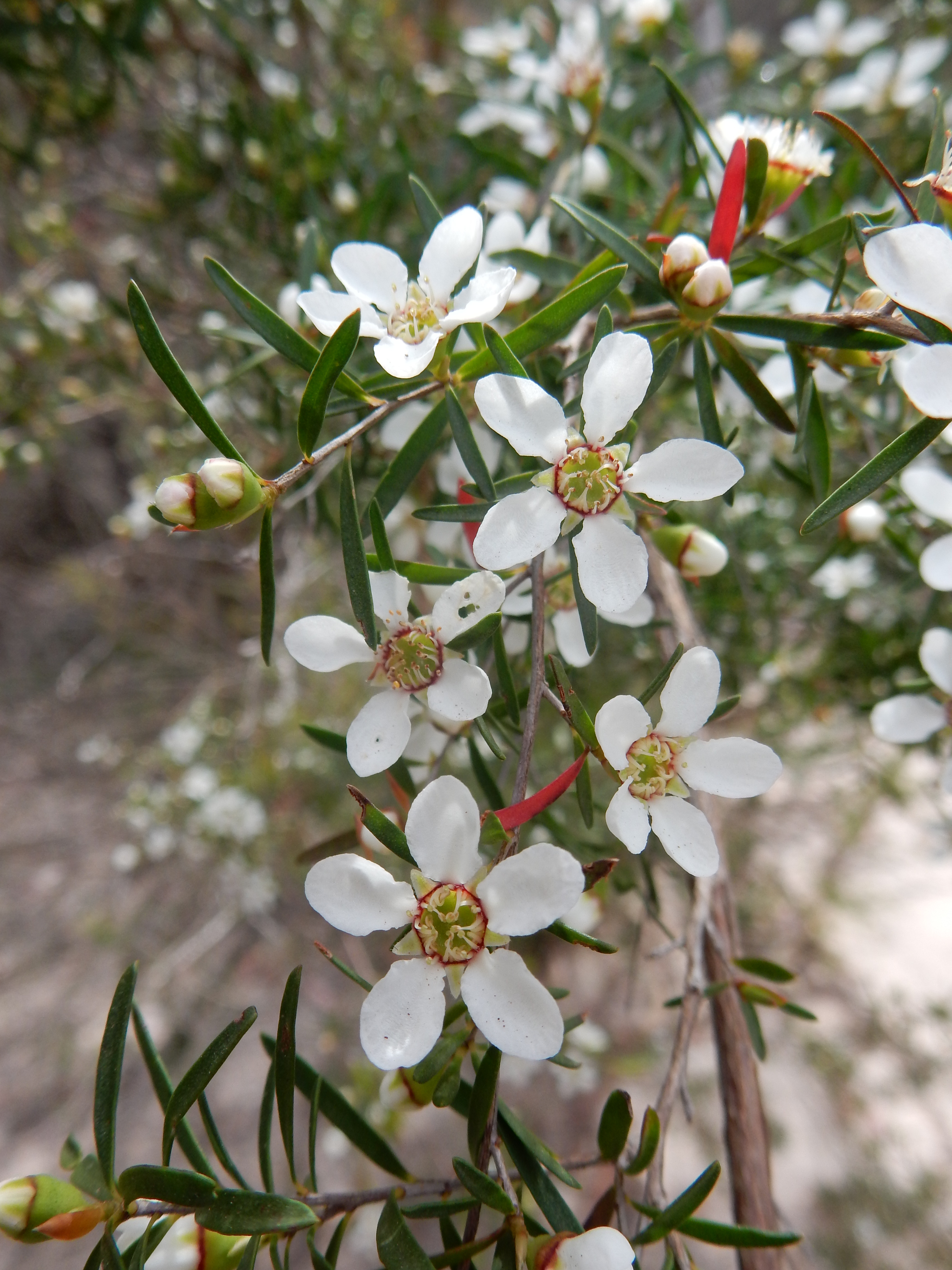
- Garigal National Park, Australia

Conservation status
- Vulnerable (EPBC Act)

Scientific classification
- Kingdom: Plantae
- Clade: Tracheophytes
- Clade: Angiosperms
- Clade: Eudicots
- Clade: Rosids
- Order: Myrtales
- Family: Myrtaceae
- Genus: Gaudium
- Species: G. deanei

Binomial name
- Gaudium deanei (Joy Thomps.) Peter G.Wilson
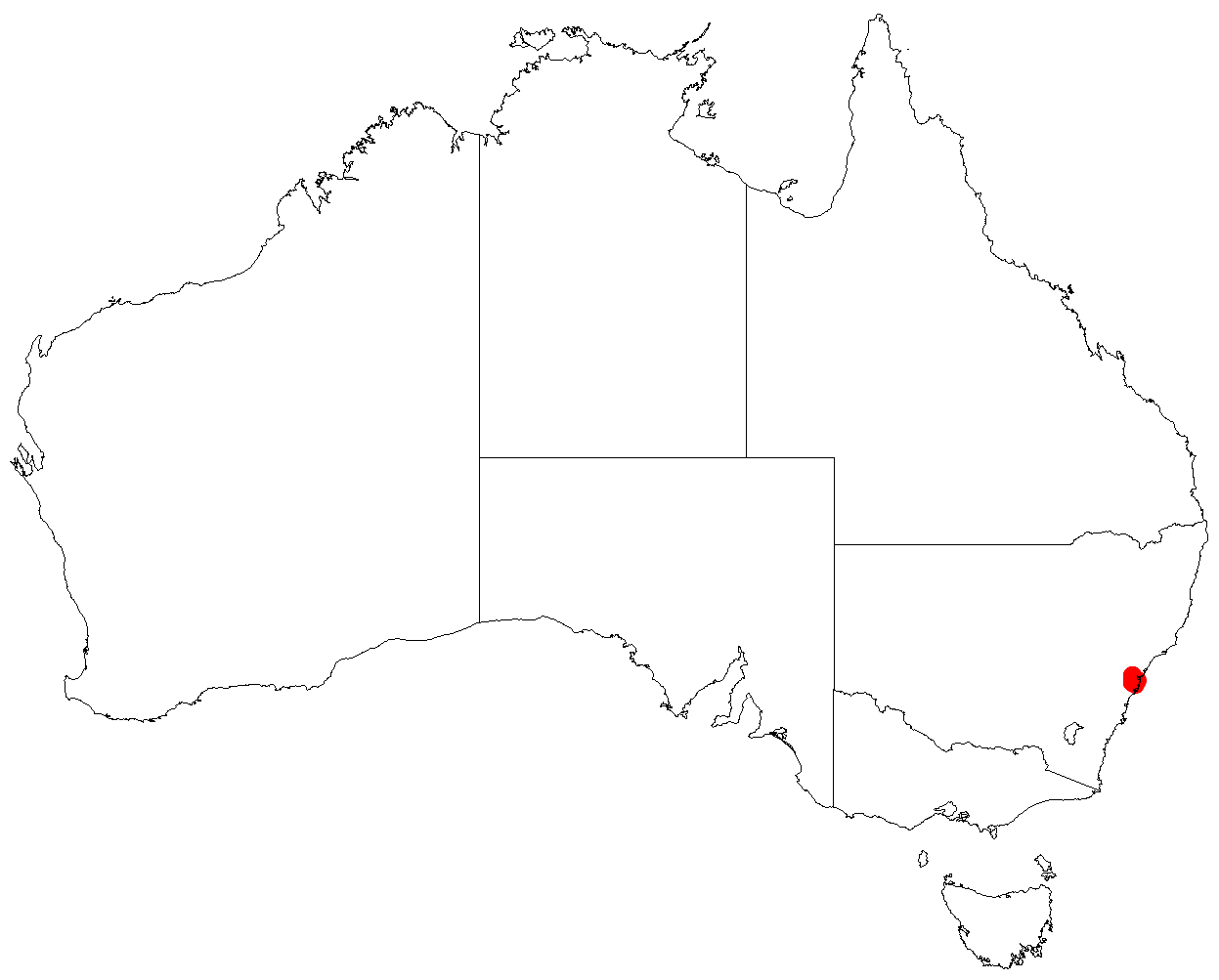
- Occurrence data from AVH

Synonyms
- Leptospermum deanei Joy Thomps.

= Gaudium deanei =

Deane's tea-tree

Species of flowering plant

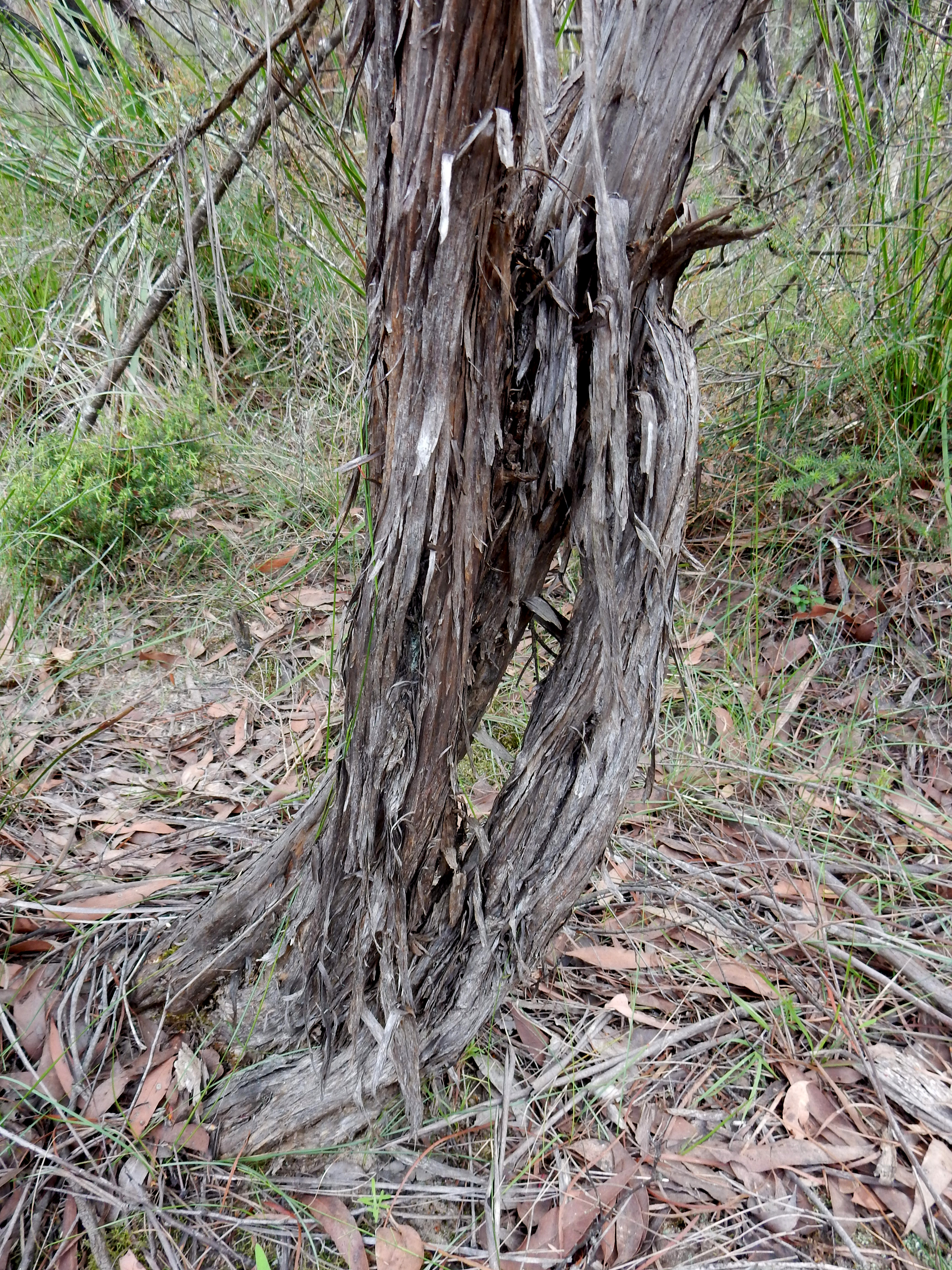
Bark

Gaudium deanei, commonly known as Deane's tea-tree, is a species of rare, slender shrub that is endemic to the northern suburbs of Sydney. It has bark peeling in long strips from the older stems, hairy young stems, narrow elliptical to lance-shaped leaves, white flowers arranged singly on short side shoots and mostly glabrous fruit.

== Description ==
Gaudium deanei is an often slender, erect shrub typically growing to 1–5 m (3 ft 3 in – 16 ft 5 in) high. On larger specimens the bark is grey and peels in long strips. Younger stems are sometimes silky. The leaves are sessile, narrow elliptical to lance-shaped, 10–15 mm (0.39–0.59 in) long and 1–2 mm (0.039–0.079 in) wide with the tip turned down with a soft, blunt tip. The flowers are borne singly on short side shoots and are white, occasionally with some pink, about 8–10 mm (0.31–0.39 in) in diameter. The floral cup is mostly glabrous on a silky-hairy pedicel. The sepals are about 1.5 mm (0.059 in) long, the petals about 5 mm (0.20 in) long and the stamens 1–1.5 mm (0.039–0.059 in) long. Flowering occurs from October to November and the fruit is about 3.5 mm (0.14 in) in diameter, mostly glabrous and falling from the plant from December. When ripe, the valves protrude beyond the rim of the capsule.

== Taxonomy and naming ==
This species was first formally described in 1989 by Joy Thompson in the journal Telopea from specimens collected near Devlins Creek in 1982. Specimens of this species were collected in 1883 by the railway engineer Henry Deane at Devlins Creek in the Lane Cove River valley and were probably collected by Deane when he was working on the nearby railway line. These specimens lay undescribed for over 100 years in the National Herbarium of New South Wales query box.

In 2023, Peter Gordon Wilson transferred the species to the genus Gaudium as G. deanei in the journal Taxon. The specific epithet honours Henry Deane.

== Distribution and habitat ==
This tea-tree grows in sandy soils in forest, woodland and shrubland on the lower slopes of valleys and near streams between Cowan Creek and the Lane Cove River. The largest population occurs in Garigal National Park.

== Conservation status ==
Gaudium deanei is listed (as Leptospermum deanei) as "vulnerable" under the Australian Government Environment Protection and Biodiversity Conservation Act 1999. Fire is likely to kill this species. However, without fire it may be out-competed by the encroachment of riparian vegetation. The ideal fire frequency is between 7 and 15 years. Other threats include invasive weeds, clearing and habitat damage caused by urban run-off and flooding.
