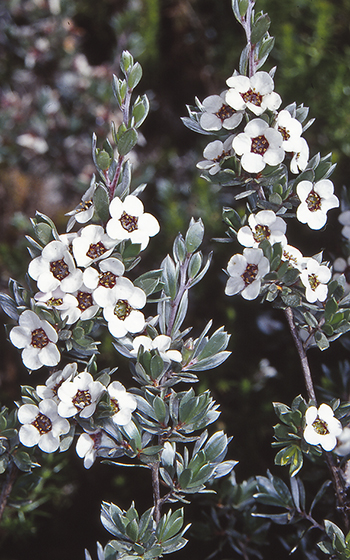
- In the ANBG

Scientific classification
- Kingdom: Plantae
- Clade: Tracheophytes
- Clade: Angiosperms
- Clade: Eudicots
- Clade: Rosids
- Order: Myrtales
- Family: Myrtaceae
- Genus: Gaudium
- Species: G. namadgiense

Binomial name
- Gaudium namadgiense (Lyne) Peter G.Wilson

Synonyms
- Leptospermum namadgiensis Lyne

= Gaudium namadgiense =

Species of flowering plant

Gaudium namadgiense is a species of small shrub that is endemic to areas near the border between New South Wales and the Australian Capital Territory. It has silky-hairy, narrow lance-shaped to elliptical leaves, usually white flowers borne singly or in pairs on short side shoots, and fruit that falls from the plant shortly after the seeds are released.

== Description ==
Gaudium namadgiense is a shrub that typically grows to a height of 0.5–1 m (1 ft 8 in – 3 ft 3 in). It has thin, rough bark that is shed in strips or in flaky layers on the older stems, and young stems that are softly-hairy at first. The leaves are narrow lance-shaped to elliptical, 3.5–9 mm (0.14–0.35 in) long and 1.5–4 mm (0.059–0.157 in) wide, tapering to a petiole about 1 mm (0.039 in) long. The leaves are usually covered on both surfaces by silky white hairs. The flowers are borne singly or in pairs on short side shoots, and are white, sometimes with a pink tinge and 6–10 mm (0.24–0.39 in) wide. The floral cup is about 2.5 mm (0.098 in) long and covered with silky white hairs. The sepals are triangular, about 1.5 mm (0.059 in) long, the petals 2.5–3 mm (0.098–0.118 in) long. There are between seven and eleven stamens. Flowering mainly occurs from December to January and the fruit is a hairy capsule 2–2.5 mm (0.079–0.098 in) wide with the remains of the sepals attached but that falls from the plant after the seeds are released.

== Taxonomy and naming ==
This species was first formally described in 1993 by Andrew M. Lyne who gave it the name Leptospermum namadgiensein the journal Telopea from specimens he collected on Mt Scabby in 1992. In 2023, Peter Gordon Wilson transferred the species to the genus Gaudium as G. namadgiense in the journal Taxon. The specific epithet (namadgiense) is from the name "namadgi" used by local Aboriginal people for the mountains south-west of Canberra.

== Distribution and habitat ==
This tea-tree usually grows in shrubland and woodland on exposed rocky ridges and mountaintops in the Namadgi National Park and Scabby Range Nature Reserve at altitudes between 1,500 and 1,820 m (4,920 and 5,970 ft).
