= Henry Deane (engineer) =

British-Australian engineer

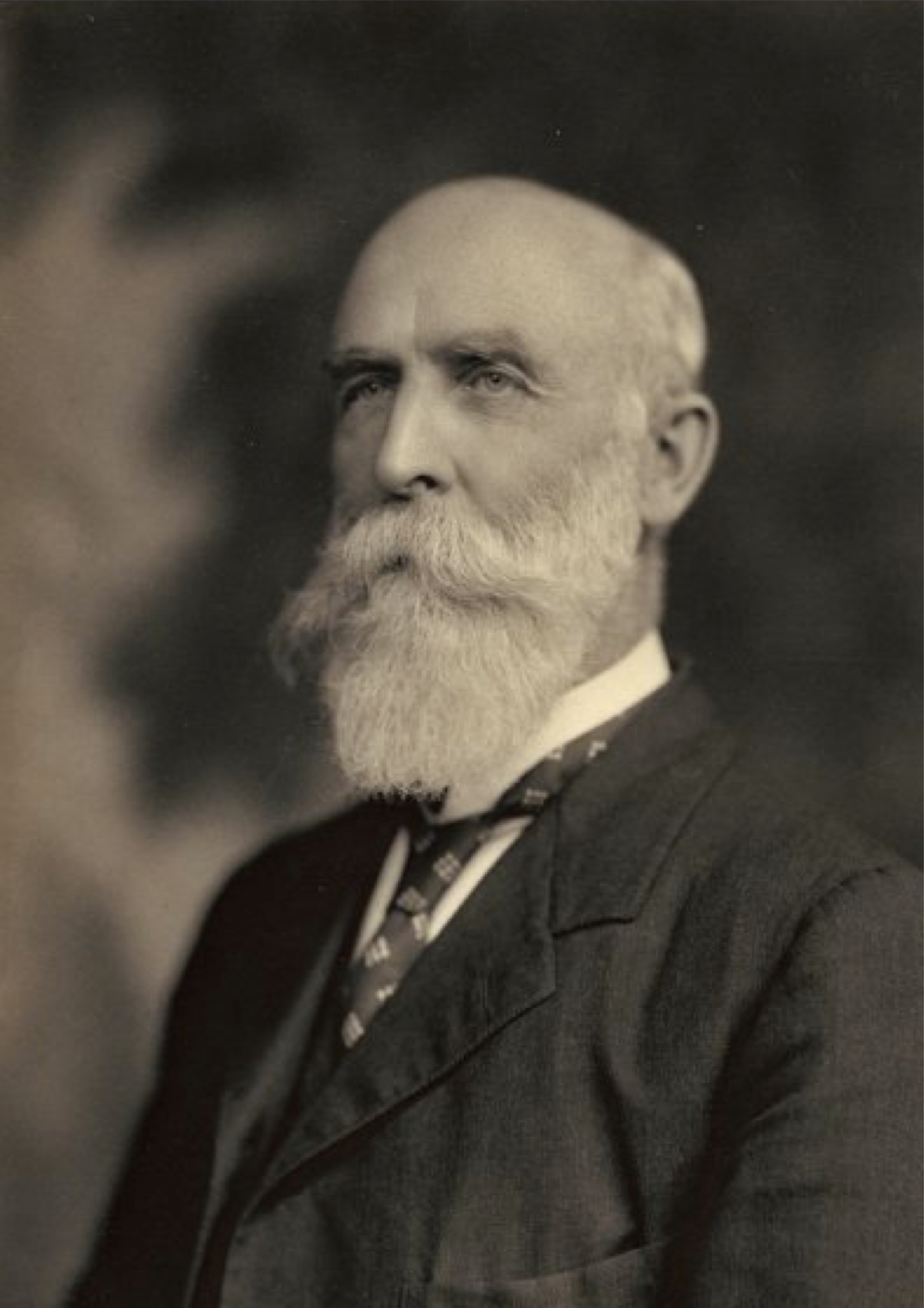
- Born: 26 March 1847; Clapham Common, England
- Died: 12 March 1924 (aged 76); Melbourne, Australia
- Citizenship: Australian
- Spouses: Anna Mathilde Schramb; Mary Lillias Lumsdaine (m. 1890–1924)
- Parent(s): Henry Deane; Jemima Elliott
- Scientific career
- Education: Queen's College, Galway; King's College, London
- Known for: Wolgan Valley Railway; Eucalyptus deanei
- Fields: Engineering, Botany

Henry Deane (26 March 1847 – 12 March 1924) was a British-Australian engineer, responsible for electrifying the Sydney tram system and for building the Wolgan Valley Railway and Trans-Australian Railway.

== Biography ==
Deane was born at Clapham Common, England, the son of Henry Deane, a chemist and fellow of the Linnean Society of London, and his wife Jemima, née Elliott. Deane was schooled in England, matriculating in 1862, then studied at Queen's College, Galway (now the National University of Ireland, Galway), where he graduated B.A. in 1865 honours in mathematics and natural science. Like many others, he was awarded M.A. in 1882 by the Queen's University of Ireland, upon its dissolution.. Deane also studied engineering for two years and obtained his diploma at King's College London as an occasional student.

After two years in the office of (later Sir) John Fowler at London, Deane was engaged by Waring Brothers from 1869 to 1871 on the Hungarian railways, and from 1871 to 1873 was chief technical assistant at the shipbuilding works of the Danube Steam Navigation Company, Althofen, Hungary. In 1875, Deane returned to England, where he was engaged in roof and bridge designs as well as survey work. In 1879, he moved to the Philippines where he worked on sugar-works. He returned to England but left for Australia at the end of 1879, arriving in Sydney in January 1880 on the Kent.

In Sydney, Deane joined the New South Wales Government Railways as a railway surveyor. He was initially involved in the trial survey of the Main Northern railway line between the Hawkesbury River and Ourimbah. In 1881, Deane was appointed District Engineer on the Gunnedah to Narrabri line. In 1883, he was District Engineer on the Homebush to Hawkesbury line. In July 1886, he became Inspecting Engineer. In June 1889, following the retirement of Edward Whitton, he became Acting Engineer-in-Chief and then Engineer-in-Chief in 1891. In 1894 and again in 1904, he made world trips studying light railways and tramway systems. From July 1899, his role expanded to include tramway construction and he took a leading part in inaugurating the Sydney electric tramway system.

One of his significant advances was the introduction of pioneer standards that lowered construction costs on low-traffic country lines.

== Second career ==
In 1905, the railway construction branch was abolished and Deane retired from the New South Wales railways.

In April 1906, he became a consultant to the Commonwealth Oil Corporation and oversaw the survey and construction of the Wolgan Valley Railway. One of his significant innovations was the use of 1 in 25 (4%) grades and 5 chain (100m) curves on a standard gauge railway and with the use of Shay locomotives.

On 25 March 1908, he was appointed consulting engineer to the Federal Government in connection with the survey of the Trans-Australian Railway between Port Augusta and Kalgoorlie. He had been closely associated with the transcontinental railway since 1903 when he represented New South Wales as chairman of a conference of Engineers-in-Chief on that matter. In 1910 he became engineer-in-chief and supervised the construction of a large portion of this railway.

Deane was also consulted on the issue of solving the national break of gauge problem. For example, he was put in charge of the third rail experiments at Tocumwal in 1915, and especially the Brennan switches.

He retired from Commonwealth Railways in April 1914 and then practised as a consulting engineer at Melbourne.

== Family ==
Deane died in Melbourne on 12 March 1924, and was buried with Anglican rites in Brighton Cemetery. He was twice married (in 1873 and 1890) and left a widow, three sons and three daughters. He was a member of the Institution of Civil Engineers and of several learned societies. He was twice president of the Royal Society of New South Wales and for two years was president of the Linnean Society of New South Wales.

In conjunction with Joseph Maiden, Deane published a series of papers on native timbers, and wrote frequently on forestry and botanical subjects. Eucalyptus deanei and Leptospermum deanei were named after him. His work on tertiary fossil botany was particularly valuable, and gave him a high reputation among the geologists of his time.

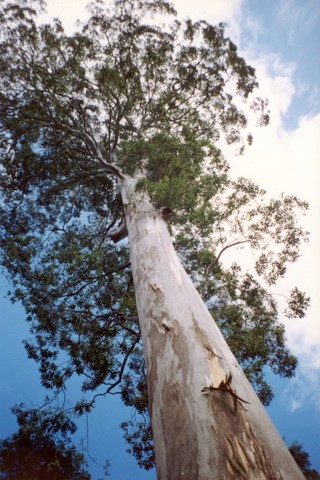
giant Eucalyptus deanei, near Woodford in Blue Mountains National Park, Australia

== Commemoration ==
The Henry Deane Plaza] near Central railway station, Sydney is named in commemoration of Henry Deane., Deane had put together plans for the station in his capacity as Engineer-in-Chief of Railway Construction on Central station began in 1901.
