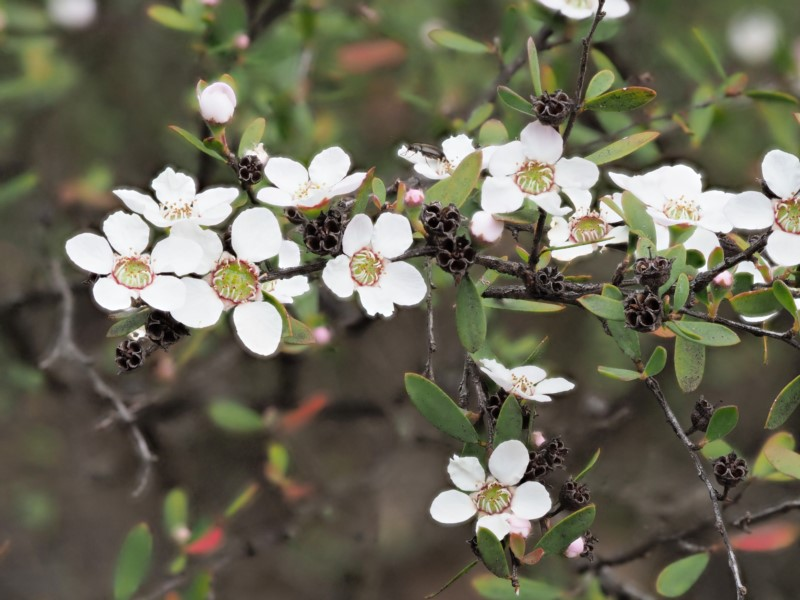
- Gaudium brevipes in Namadgi National Park

Scientific classification
- Kingdom: Plantae
- Clade: Tracheophytes
- Clade: Angiosperms
- Clade: Eudicots
- Clade: Rosids
- Order: Myrtales
- Family: Myrtaceae
- Genus: Gaudium
- Species: G. brevipes

Binomial name
- Gaudium brevipes (F.Muell.) Peter G.Wilson
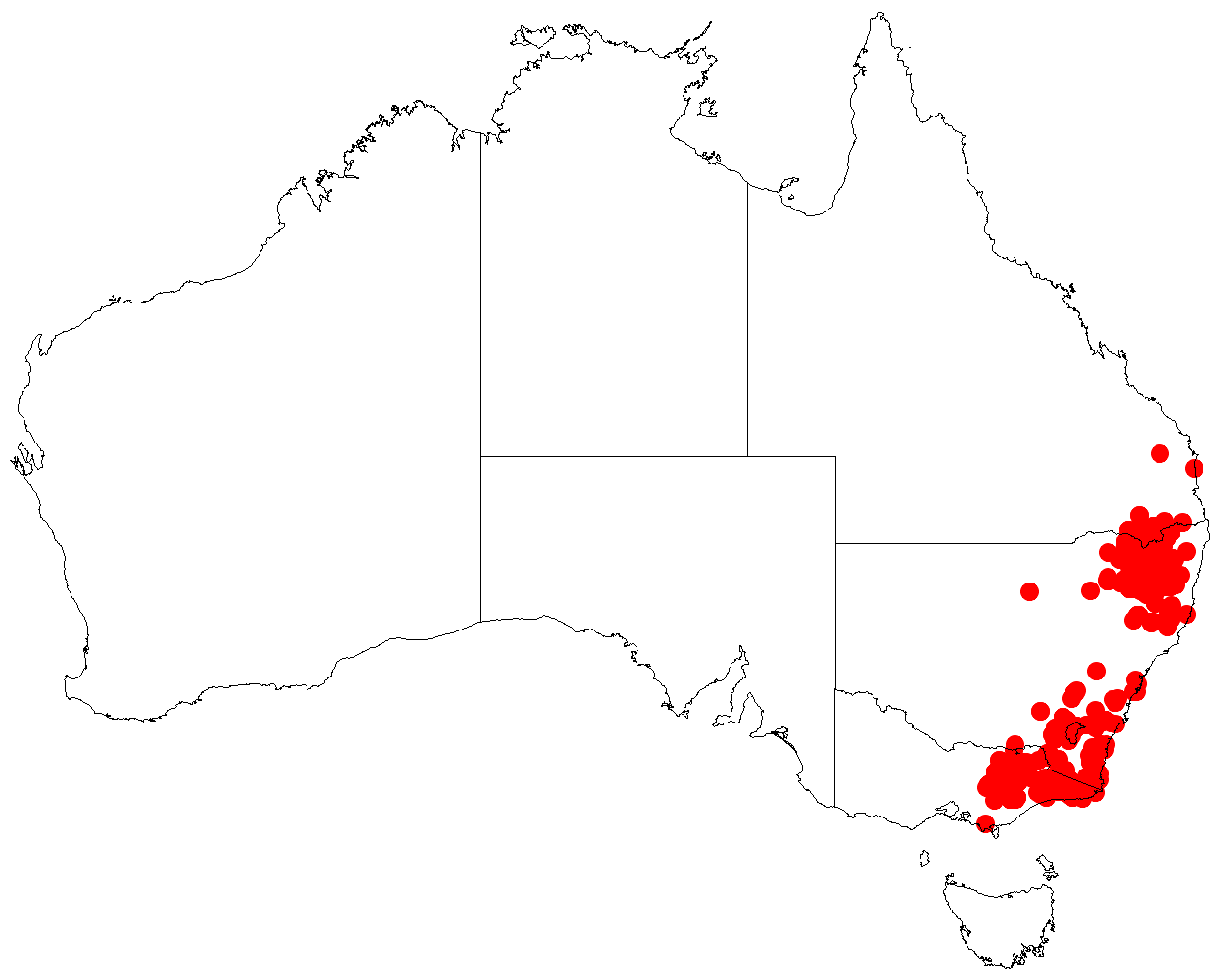
- Occurrence data from AVH

Synonyms
- Leptospermum brevipes F.Muell.

= Gaudium brevipes =

Slender tea-tree

Australian species of plant

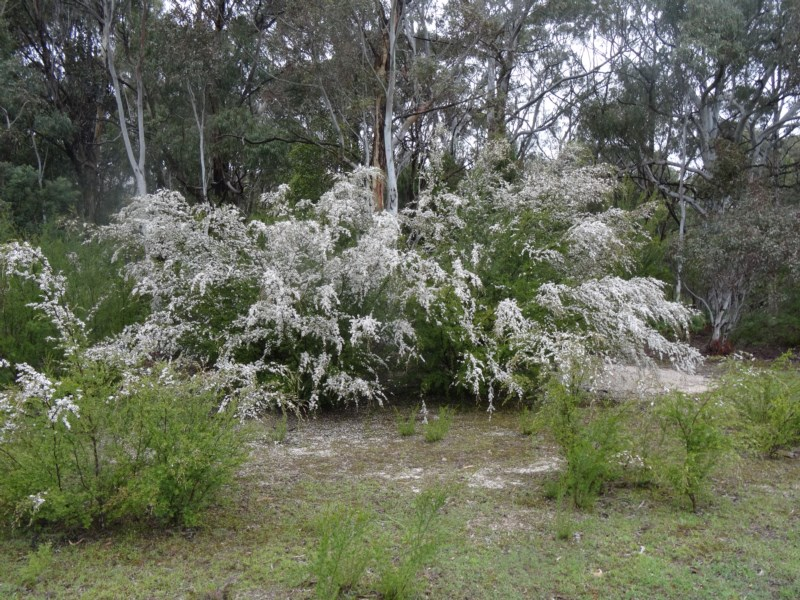
Habit in Tidbinbilla Nature Reserve

Gaudium brevipes, commonly known as the slender tea-tree, is a species of shrub or small tree that is endemic to eastern Australia. It has fibrous bark on the main stems, smooth bark on young stems, narrow elliptical to narrow egg-shaped leaves, white flowers and hemispherical fruit that is shed when mature.

== Description ==
Gaudium brevipes is a shrub or small tree that typically grows to 4 m (13 ft) high. The bark on its larger stems is rough but young stems have smooth bark that is shed in stringy strips and have a flange near the base of the petiole. The leaves are narrow elliptical to narrow egg-shaped, 6–25 mm (0.24–0.98 in) long, 2–4.5 mm (0.079–0.177 in) wide, hairy at first but become glabrous. The flowers are borne singly or in pairs in leaf axils and are 6–8 mm (0.24–0.31 in) in diameter on a pedicel 2–8 mm (0.079–0.315 in) long. The floral cup is hairy and about 2 mm (0.079 in) long. The sepals are triangular, silky hairy and about 1 mm (0.039 in) long. The petals are white, 3–4 mm (0.12–0.16 in) long and the stamens are about 1 mm (0.039 in) long. Flowering occurs from October to December and the fruit is a silky-hairy, hemispherical capsule 3–4 mm (0.12–0.16 in) in diameter with the sepals attached and that is shed when mature.

== Taxonomy and naming ==
This species was first formally described in 1855 by Ferdinand von Mueller who gave it the name Leptospermum brevipes in his book Definitions of rare or hitherto undescribed Australian plants. In 2023, Peter Gordon Wilson transferred the species to the genus Gaudium as G. brevipes in the journal Taxon. The specific epithet (brevipes) is a Latin word meaning "short-footed".

== Distribution and habitat ==
Slender tea-tree grows in woodland and shrubland, usually on rocky granite outcrops and near rocky streams. It occurs from the Granite Belt in south-eastern Queensland, mostly along the tablelands of New South Wales and the Australian Capital Territory to eastern Victoria.
