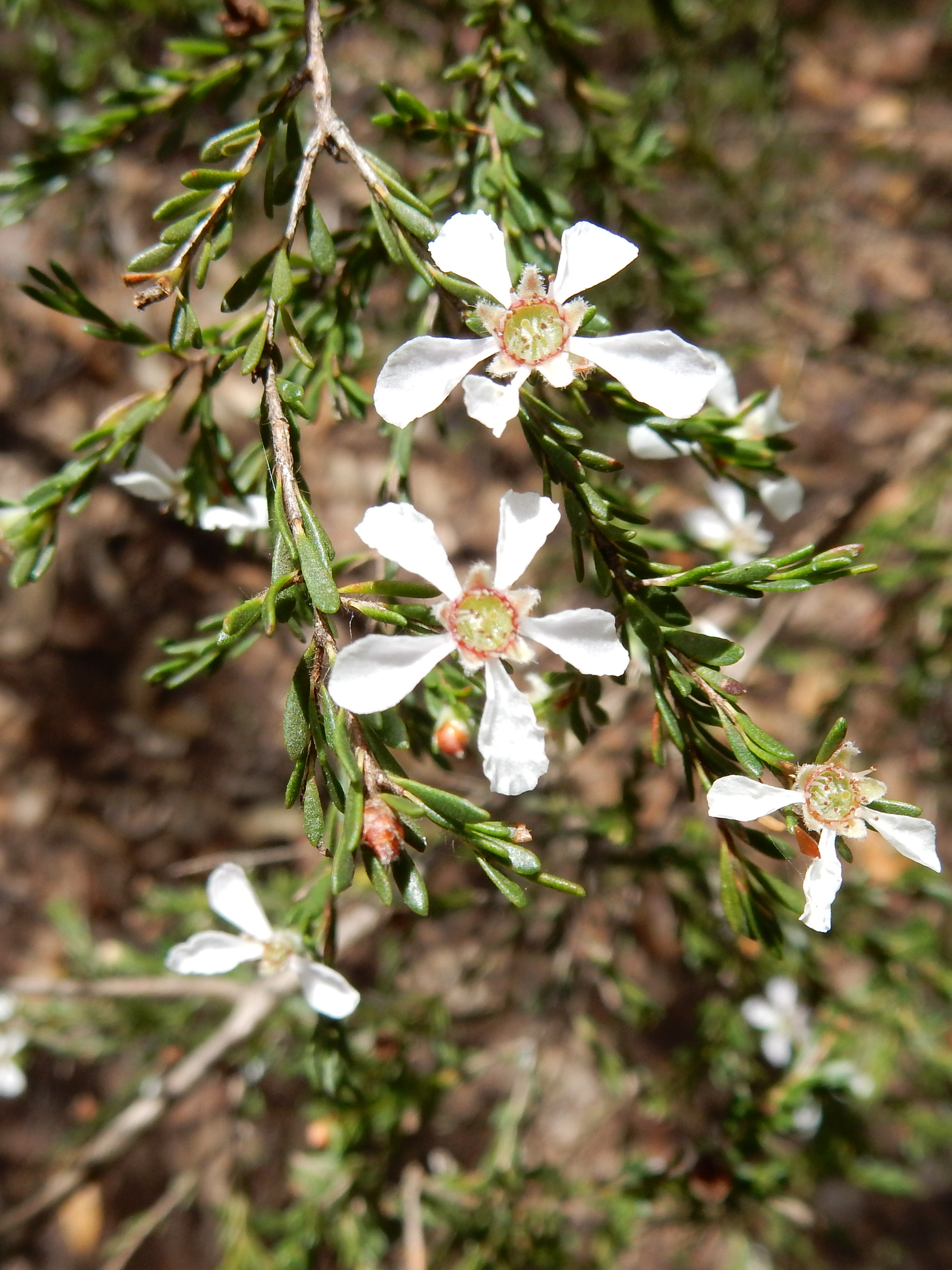
- In Garigal National Park, Australia

Scientific classification
- Kingdom: Plantae
- Clade: Tracheophytes
- Clade: Angiosperms
- Clade: Eudicots
- Clade: Rosids
- Order: Myrtales
- Family: Myrtaceae
- Genus: Gaudium
- Species: G. parvifolium

Binomial name
- Gaudium parvifolium (Sm.) Peter G.Wilson

Synonyms
- Leptospermum parvifolium Sm.; Leptospermum eriocalyx Sieber ex Spreng.; Leptospermum ovale Dum.Cours.

= Gaudium parvifolium =

Lemon-scented tea-tree

Species of flowering plant

Gaudium parvifolium, commonly known as lemon-scented tea-tree, is a species of shrub that is endemic to eastern Australia. It has thin, rough bark, egg-shaped leaves with the narrower end towards the base, white or pink flowers, and fruit with the remains of the sepals attached but that is shed when the seeds are mature.

== Description ==
Gaudium parvifolium is a shrub that typically grows to a height of 1–2 m (3 ft 3 in – 6 ft 7 in) and has thin branches with thin, rough, sometimes flaky bark, the younger stems sometimes hairy. The leaves are egg-shaped with the narrower end towards the base, 3–8 mm (0.12–0.31 in) long and 1–3 mm (0.039–0.118 in) wide tapering to a petiole about 1 mm (0.039 in) long. The flowers are white or pink, about 10 mm (0.39 in) in diameter and usually arranged singly on short side shoots. The flower buds have sometimes large, egg-shaped, reddish brown bracts and bracteoles at the base but that usually fall as the flower opens. The floral cup is hairy, 2–2.5 mm (0.079–0.098 in) long and the sepals triangular, 1–2 mm (0.039–0.079 in) long. The petals are about 4 mm (0.16 in) long and the stamens 1–1.5 mm (0.039–0.059 in) long. Flowering mainly occurs from September to November and the fruit is a capsule that has the remnants of the sepals attached but that falls off soon after the end of the flowering season.

== Taxonomy and naming ==
The type specimen of Leptospermum parvifolium was collected by Surgeon John White at Port Jackson in 1795. The plant first appeared in scientific literature in 1797, in the Transactions of the Linnean Society of London published by the eminent 18th century botanist James Edward Smith. In 2023, Peter Gordon Wilson transferred the species to the genus Gaudium as G. parvifolium in the journal Taxon. The specific epithet (parvifolium) is derived from Latin, meaning ‘’small leaves’’.

== Distribution and habitat ==
Gaudium parvifolium grows in dry sclerophyll forest on shallow soils, especially in sandy and rocky areas. It is widespread and common on the northern and central slopes and tablelands of New South Wales, and on the south coast as far south as Nowra. It has also been recorded in south-eastern Queensland.
