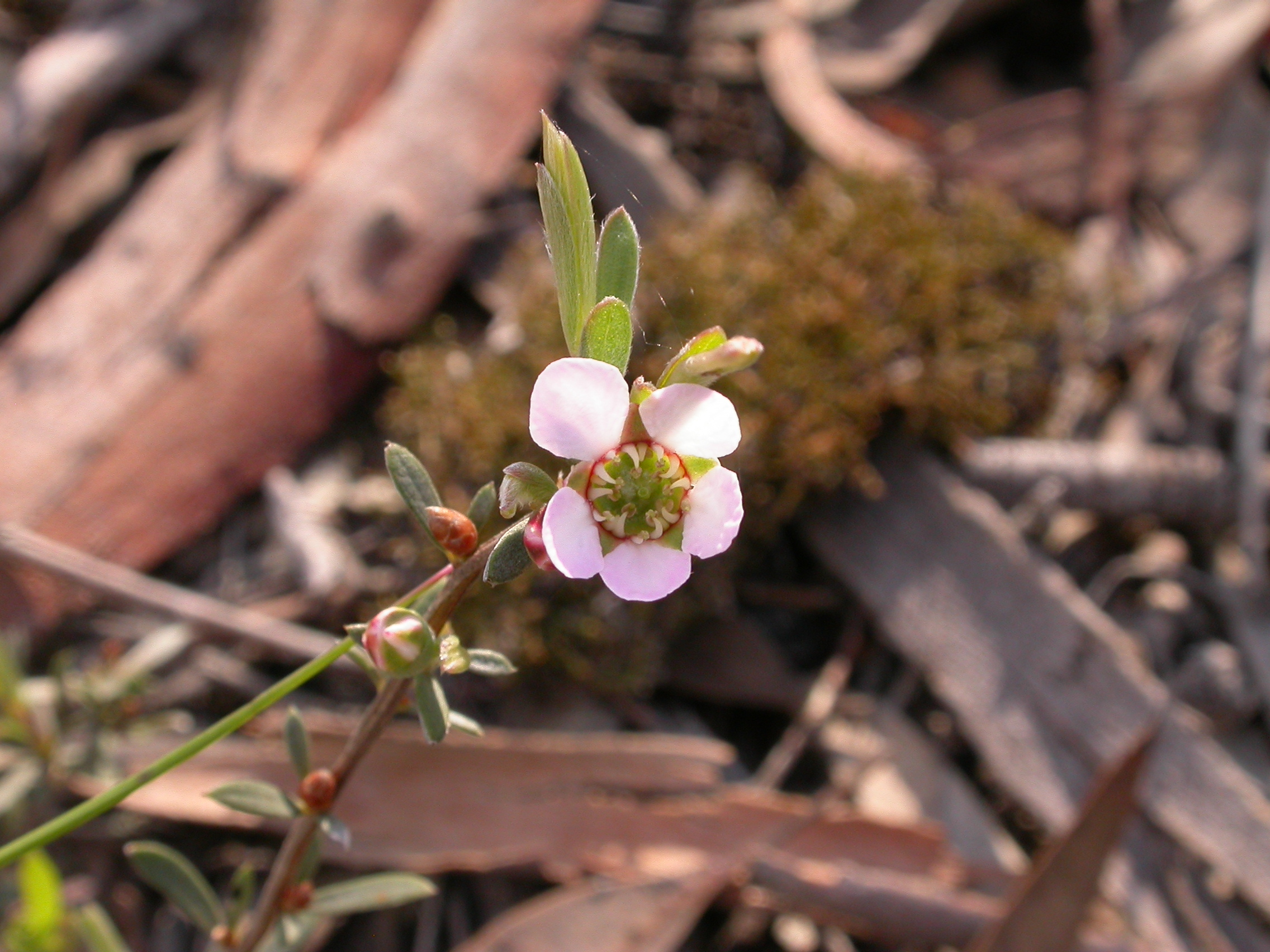
- Black Mountain, Australian Capital Territory, Australia

Scientific classification
- Kingdom: Plantae
- Clade: Tracheophytes
- Clade: Angiosperms
- Clade: Eudicots
- Clade: Rosids
- Order: Myrtales
- Family: Myrtaceae
- Genus: Gaudium
- Species: G. multicaule

Binomial name
- Gaudium multicaule (A.Cunn.) Peter G.Wilson

Synonyms
- Leptospermum multicaule A.Cunn.

= Gaudium multicaule =

Silver tea-tree

Species of flowering plant

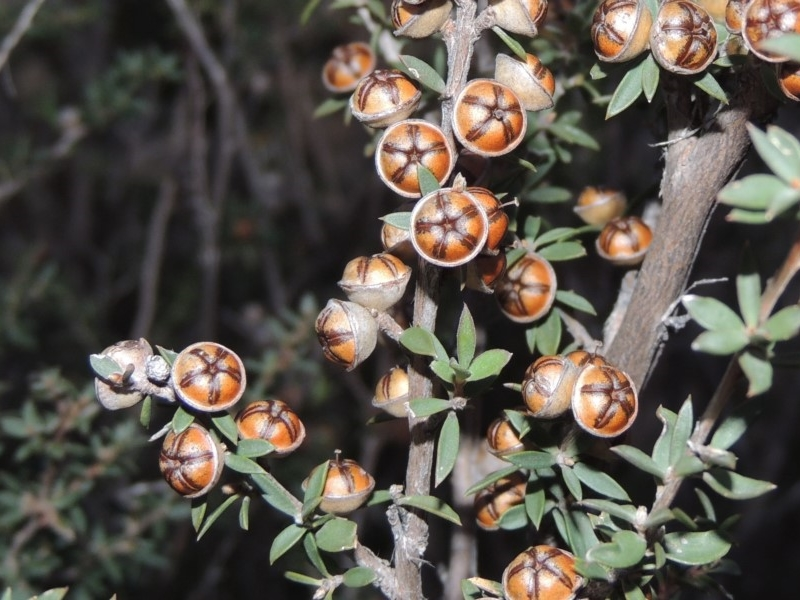
Fruit

Gaudium multicaule, commonly known as the silver tea-tree, is a species of shrub that is endemic to south eastern Australia. It has linear, narrow elliptical or narrow egg-shaped leaves, white or pink flowers usually borne singly on short side shoots, and fruit the falls from the plant soon after the seeds are released.

== Description ==
Gaudium multicaule is a shrub that typically grows to a height of 1.5 m (4 ft 11 in) and has smooth bark that is shed from the smaller stems in stringy strips. The leaves are linear, narrow elliptical to narrow egg-shaped with the narrower end towards the base, 2–20 mm (0.079–0.787 in) long and 1–3 mm (0.039–0.118 in) wide, tapering to a very short, broad petiole. The flowers are usually borne singly, sometimes in pairs on short side shoots, and are white or pink and 6–10 mm (0.24–0.39 in) wide. There are broad reddish brown bracts at the base of the flower bud but which fall off as the flower opens. The floral cup is covered with flattened, silky hairs and about 2.5 mm (0.098 in) long on a pedicel less than 1 mm (0.039 in) long. The sepals are triangular, 1–1.5 mm (0.039–0.059 in) long, the petals about 2.5 mm (0.098 in) long and the stamens less than 1.5 mm (0.059 in) long. Flowering mainly occurs from October to November and the fruit is a hemispherical capsule 3–3.5 mm (0.12–0.14 in) wide with the remains of the sepals attached, but which fall from the plant soon after the seeds are released.

== Taxonomy and naming ==
This species was first described in 1825 by Allan Cunningham who gave it the name Leptospermum multicaule in a Chapter entitled On the Botany of the Blue Mountains in Barron Field's book Geographical Memoirs on New South Wales. The type specimens were collected near Bathurst. In 2023, Peter Gordon Wilson transferred the species to the genus Gaudium as G. multicaule in the journal Taxon.

== Distribution and habitat ==
Silver tea-tree grows in woodland and on dry hillsides south from the Bathurst district in New South Wales through the Australian Capital Territory to northern Victoria.
