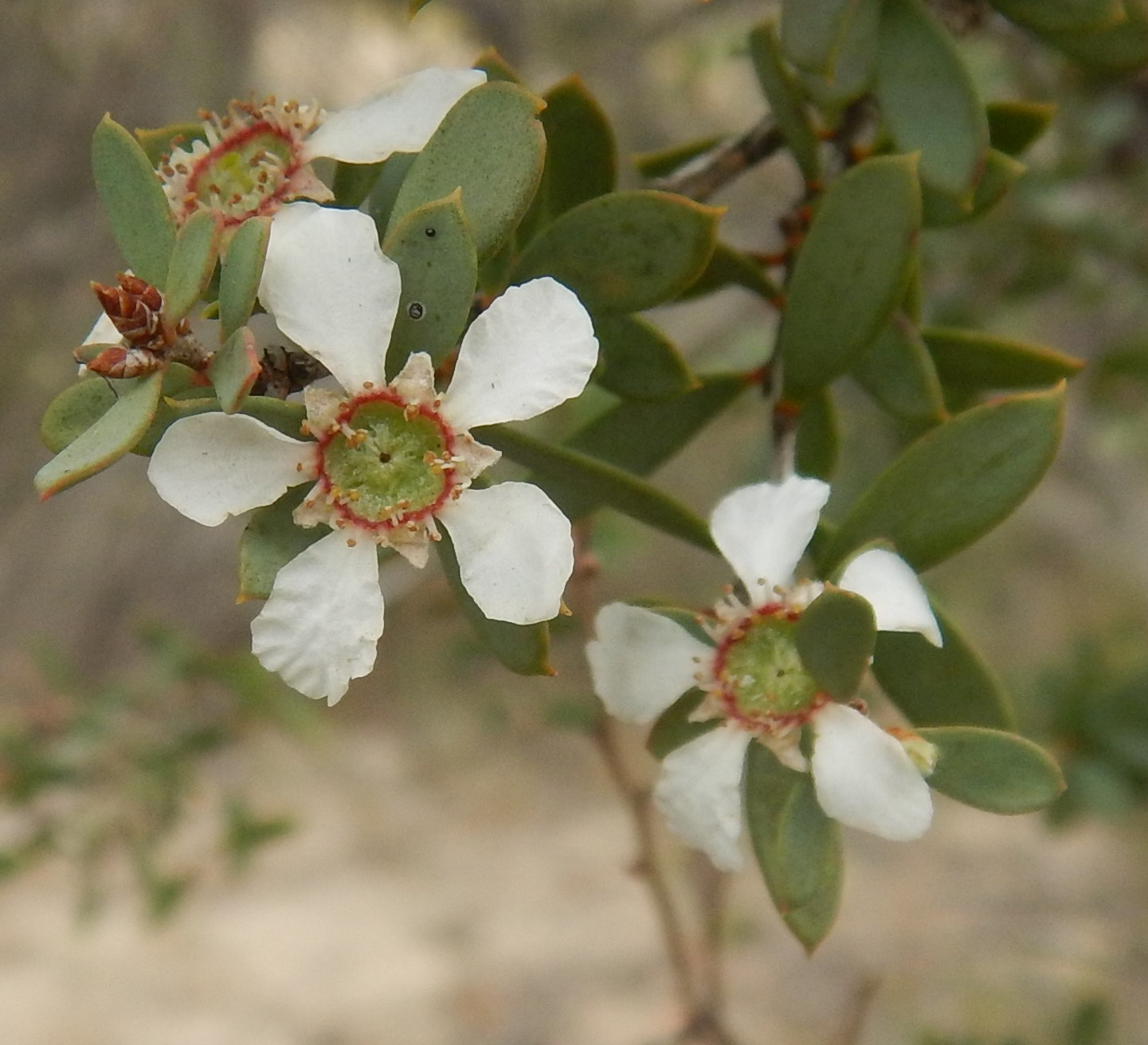
- Gaudium coriaceum flowers and leaves

Scientific classification
- Kingdom: Plantae
- Clade: Tracheophytes
- Clade: Angiosperms
- Clade: Eudicots
- Clade: Rosids
- Order: Myrtales
- Family: Myrtaceae
- Genus: Gaudium
- Species: G. coriaceum

Binomial name
- Gaudium coriaceum (F.Muell.) Peter G.Wilson
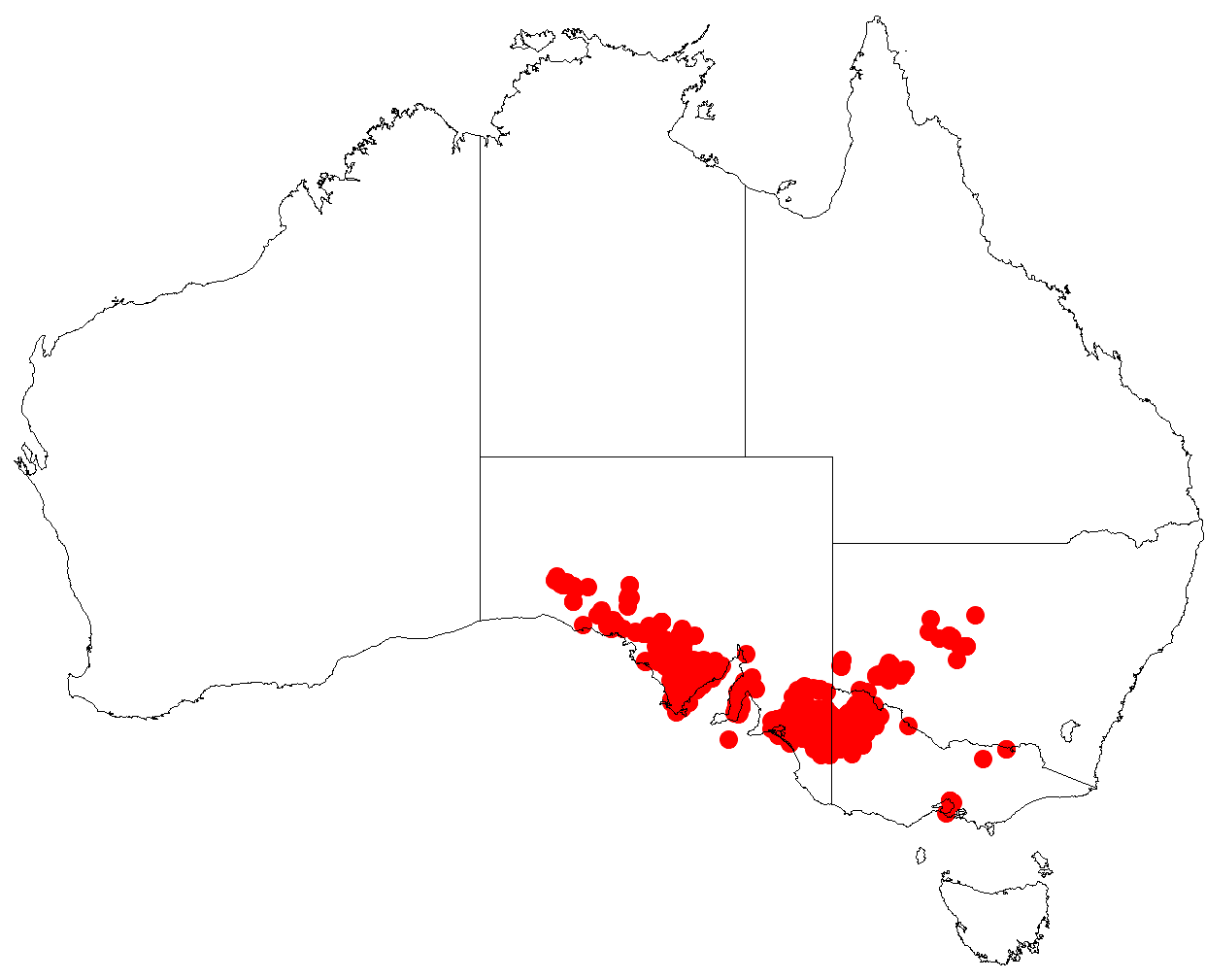
- Occurrence data from AVH

Synonyms
- Fabricia coriacea F.Muell.; Leptospermum coriaceum (F.Muell.) Cheel; Leptospermum laevigatum var. minus Benth.

= Gaudium coriaceum =

Green tea-tree

Species of flowering plant

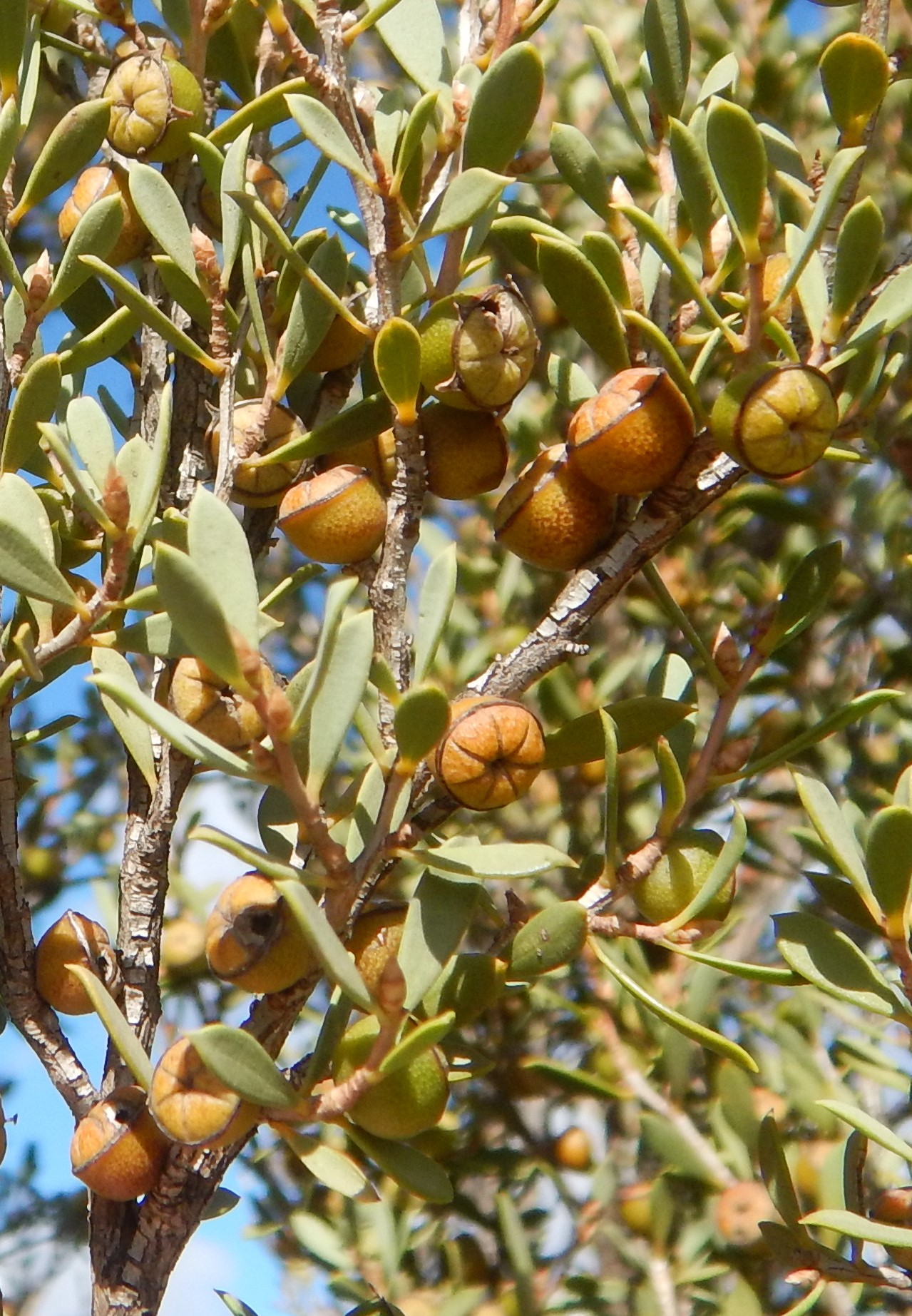
Fruit

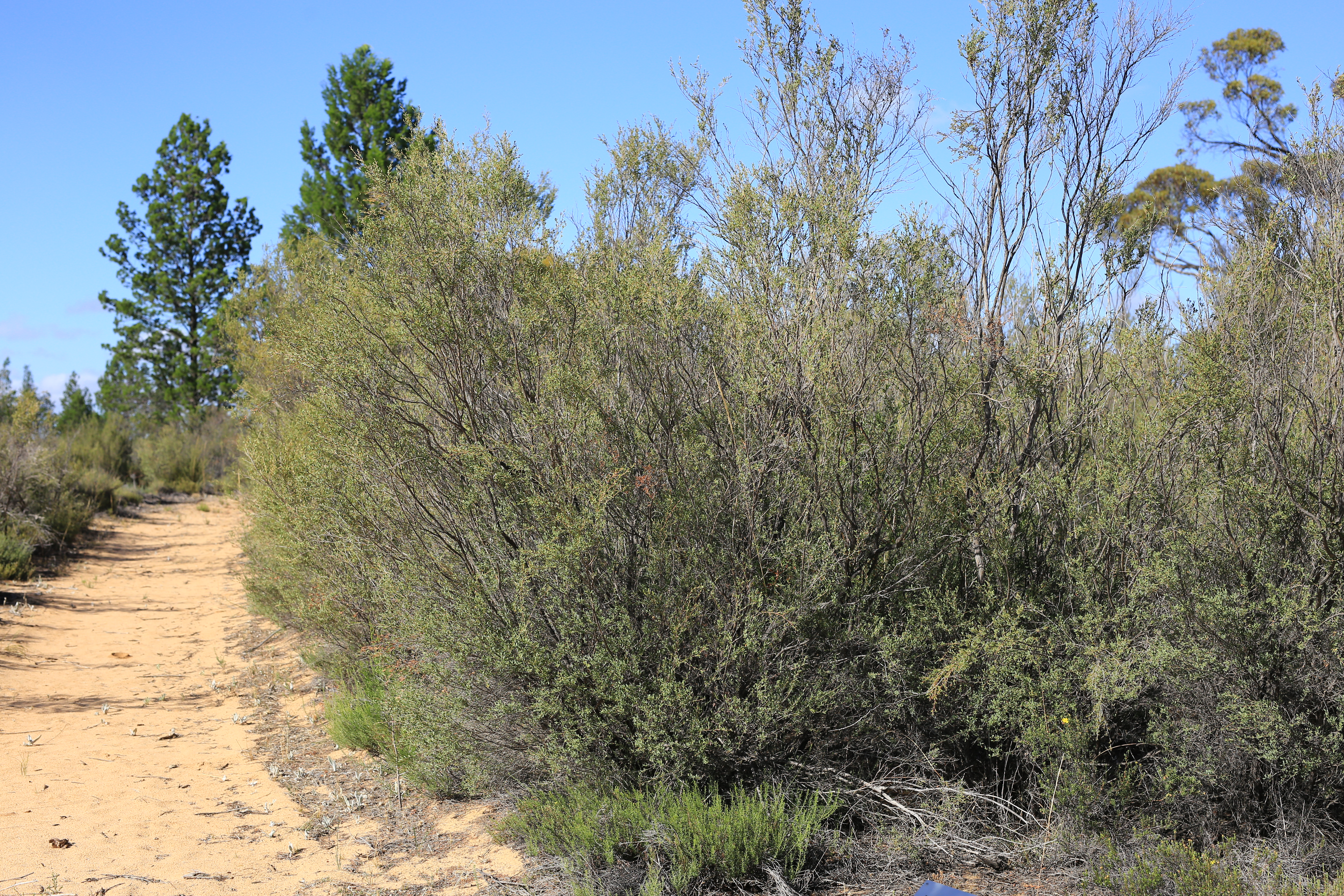
Habit in Wyperfeld National Park

Gaudium coriaceum, commonly known as green tea-tree or mallee teatree, is a shrub species that is endemic to south-eastern and south-central Australia. It has smooth bark on the younger stems, elliptic to narrow egg-shaped leaves, white flowers and woody fruit. The usual habitat is mallee on sand dunes.

== Description ==
Gaudium coriaceum is a spreading shrub that typically grows to a height of 2 m (6 ft 7 in). It has rough bark that is shed annually on the larger branches and smooth bark on the younger stems. The leaves are egg-shaped to lance-shaped or elliptical, 8–20 mm (0.31–0.79 in) long and 3–5 mm (0.12–0.20 in) wide with a short, blunt point on the tip and a short petiole at the base. The flowers are 12–15 mm (0.47–0.59 in) in diameter and are borne in pairs on short shoots in leaf axils. The floral cup is sessile, glabrous or silky, 1.5–2.5 mm (0.059–0.098 in) long. The sepals are triangular, 1.5–2 mm (0.059–0.079 in) long, the petals white, 4–7 mm (0.16–0.28 in) long and the stamens 1–2 mm (0.039–0.079 in) long. Flowering occurs from June to October or November and the fruit is a woody capsule 5–8 mm (0.20–0.31 in) wide and that falls off the plant when the seeds are released.

== Taxonomy and naming ==
This species was first formally described in 1856 by Ferdinand von Mueller who gave it the name Fabricia coriacea and published the description in a paper in the journal Nederlandsch Kruidkundig Archief. (The paper was written by Friedrich Anton Wilhelm Miquel but the name and descriptive paragraphs are attributed to Mueller.) In 2023, Peter Gordon Wilson transferred the species to the genus Gaudium as G. coriaceum in the journal Taxon. The specific epithet (coriaceum) is a Latin word meaning "leathery".

== Distribution and habitat ==
Gaudium coriaceum grows in mallee and heath in deep sandy soil on sand dunes from southern South Australia and north western Victoria to south of Cobar in inland New South Wales.
