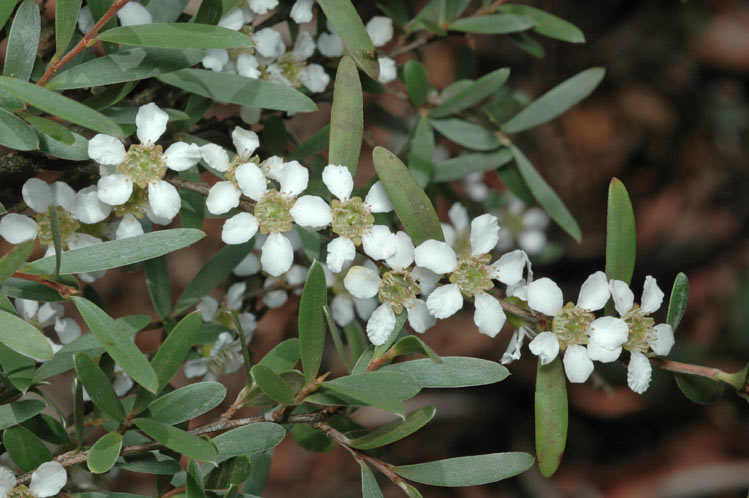
- In the Australian National Botanic Gardens

Scientific classification
- Kingdom: Plantae
- Clade: Tracheophytes
- Clade: Angiosperms
- Clade: Eudicots
- Clade: Rosids
- Order: Myrtales
- Family: Myrtaceae
- Genus: Gaudium
- Species: G. polyanthum

Binomial name
- Gaudium polyanthum (Joy Thomps.) Peter G.Wilson

Synonyms
- Leptospermum polyanthum Joy Thomps.

= Gaudium polyanthum =

Species of flowering plant

Gaudium polyanthum is a rigid, spreading shrub or small tree that is endemic to New South Wales. It has thin, rough bark, young stems that are hairy at first, elliptical leaves, relatively small white flowers and fruit are shed when the seeds are mature.

== Description ==
Gaudium polyanthum is a spreading shrub or small tree, often with pendulous branches, that typically grows to a height of up to 5 m (16 ft). The bark on older stems is thin and rough, often furrowed or flaky, the younger stems have silky hairs at first. The leaves are elliptical 10–25 mm (0.39–0.98 in) long and 2–4 mm (0.079–0.157 in) wide tapering to a short, thin petiole. The flowers are borne singly, sometimes in pairs, on short side shoots from adjacent leaf axils and are white, 5–6 mm (0.20–0.24 in) wide. There are a few reddish-brown bracts and bracteoles at the base of the young flower buds but are soon shed. The floral cup is usually glabrous, about 2 mm (0.079 in) long and the sepals are egg-shaped and about 0.7 mm (0.028 in) long. The petals are about 3 mm (0.12 in) long and the stamens 1–1.5 mm (0.039–0.059 in) long. Flowering mainly occurs from October to January and the fruit is a capsule about 3 mm (0.12 in) in diameter with the remains of the sepals attached, and that is usually shed from the plant before the next flowering season.

== Taxonomy and naming ==
Gaudium polyanthum was first formally described in 1989 by Joy Thompson in the journal Telopea, based on plant material collected by Ernest Constable near the Nepean Dam near Bargo in 1953. In 2023, Peter Gordon Wilson transferred the species to the genus Gaudium as G. parvifolium in the journal Taxon. The specific epithet (polyanthum) refers to the large number of flowers produced on the flowering stems.

== Distribution and habitat ==
This tea-tree grows on rocky escarpments on rocky gullies near streams and is found south of the Warrumbungles and Armidale district and along the coast and tablelands to the Wombeyan Caves.
