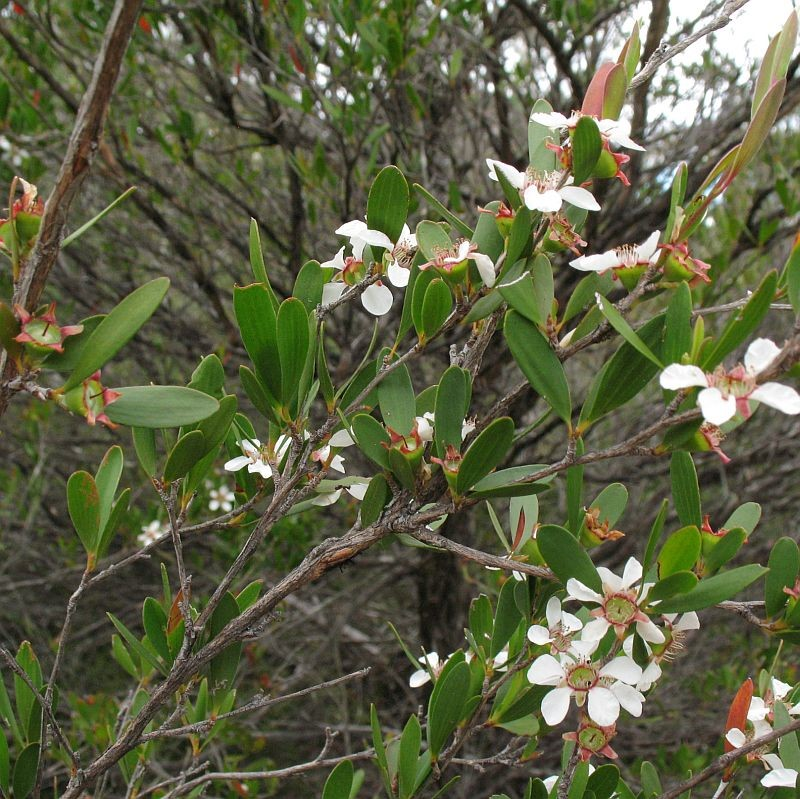
- In Deua National Park

Scientific classification
- Kingdom: Plantae
- Clade: Tracheophytes
- Clade: Angiosperms
- Clade: Eudicots
- Clade: Rosids
- Order: Myrtales
- Family: Myrtaceae
- Genus: Gaudium
- Species: G. subglabratum

Binomial name
- Gaudium subglabratum (Joy Thomps.) Peter G.Wilson

Synonyms
- Leptospermum subglabratum Joy Thomps.

= Gaudium subglabratum =

Species of shrub

Gaudium subglabratum is a species of open shrub that is endemic to a south-eastern New South Wales. It has thin, rough bark, egg-shaped to lance-shaped leaves with the narrower end towards the base, white flowers arranged singly on short side shoots and relatively small fruit that falls from the plant at maturity.

== Description ==
Gaudium subglabratum is a shrub that typically grows to a height of more than 2 m (6 ft 7 in) and has thin, firm bark that is shed in flakes, and younger stems that are hairy at first. The leaves are narrow egg-shaped to narrow lance-shaped with the narrower end towards the base, 15–35 mm (0.59–1.38 in) long and 3–7 mm (0.12–0.28 in) wide, with a pointed, usually blunt tip and tapering to a short petiole. The flowers are white, 10–15 mm (0.39–0.59 in) wide and are borne singly on short side shoots. The floral cup is glabrous, about 4–5 mm (0.16–0.20 in) long, on a silky-hairy pedicel 1–1.5 mm (0.039–0.059 in) long. The sepals are hairy, 2.5–3.5 mm (0.098–0.138 in) long, the petals 5–6 mm (0.20–0.24 in) long and the stamens 2–2.5 mm (0.079–0.098 in) long. Flowering mainly occurs from December to January and the fruit is a capsule 4–7 mm (0.16–0.28 in) in diameter with the remains of the sepals attached. The fruit falls from the plant at maturity.

== Taxonomy ==
This species was first formally described in 1989 by Joy Thompson who gave it the name Leptospermum subglabratum in the journal Telopea, based on plant material collected by Barbara Briggs near Shrouded Gods Mountains in the Budawangs. In 2023, Peter Gordon Wilson transferred the species to the genus Gaudium as G. parvifolium in the journal Taxon.

== Distribution and habitat ==
This teatree is restricted to a small area of south-east New South Wales, mainly in the Budawangs, where it grow on the edge of sandstone cliffs.
