= Gaudium confertum =

Conservation status
- Priority Two — Poorly Known Taxa (DEC)

Scientific classification
- Kingdom: Plantae
- Clade: Tracheophytes
- Clade: Angiosperms
- Clade: Eudicots
- Clade: Rosids
- Order: Myrtales
- Family: Myrtaceae
- Genus: Gaudium
- Species: G. confertum

Binomial name
- Gaudium confertum (Joy Thomps.) Peter G.Wilson
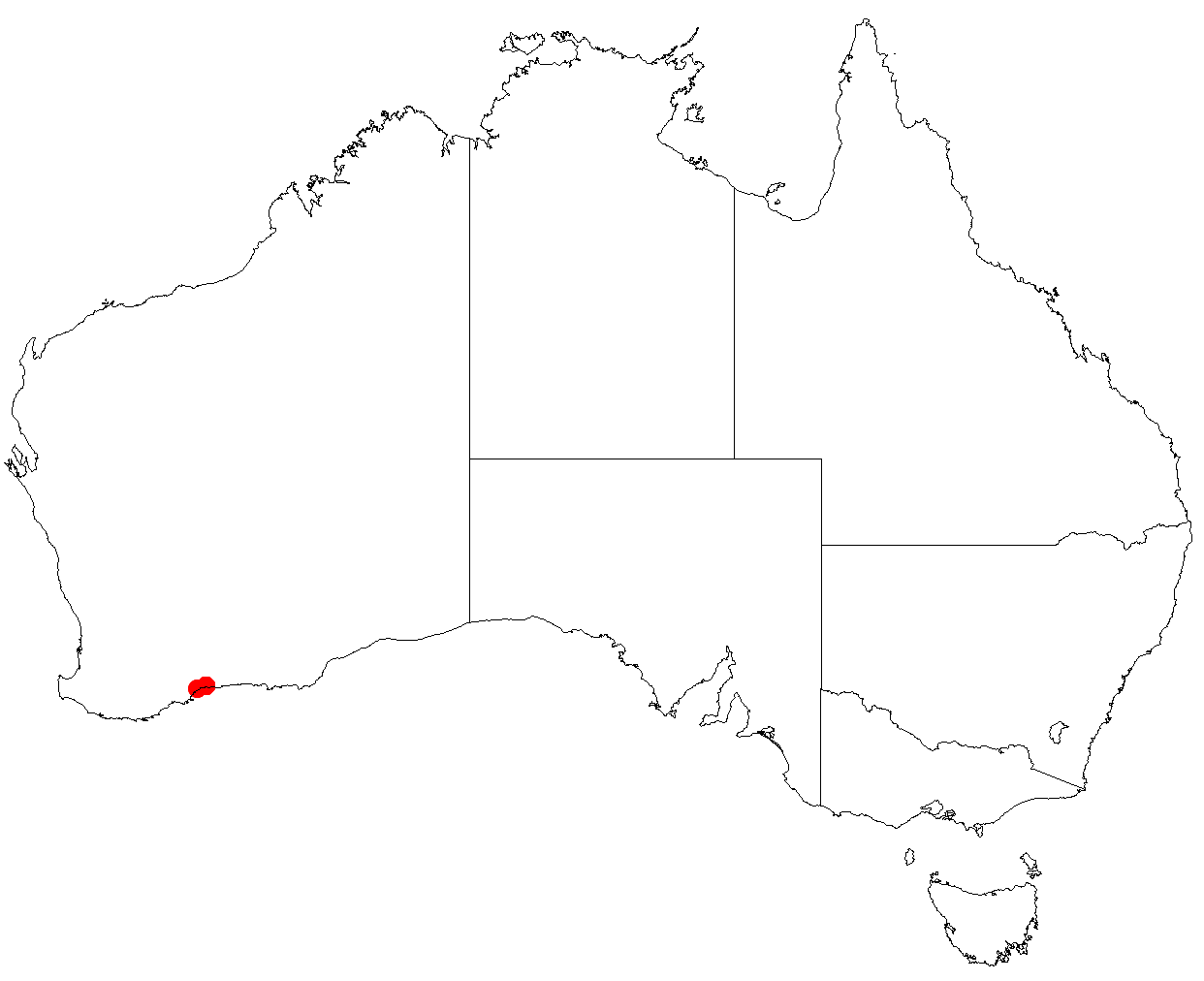
- Occurrence data from AVH

Synonyms
- Leptospermum confertum Joy Thomps.

Species of shrub

Gaudium confertum is a species of shrub that is endemic to East Mount Barren on the south coast of Western Australia. It has rough bark, crowded narrow club-shaped leaves and white flowers that are pinkish in bud.

== Description ==
Gaudium confertum is an erect shrub that typically grows to a height of 2–3 m (6 ft 7 in – 9 ft 10 in) or more and has gnarled, firm bark. Young branches are hairy at first and have a small swelling below each leaf base. The leaves are erect and densely crowded, mostly 8–10 mm (0.31–0.39 in) long and 1–1.5 mm (0.039–0.059 in) wide, tapering to a petiole about 1.5 mm (0.059 in) long. The flowers are borne singly in leaf axils with pale reddish brown bracts and bracteoles at their base. The flowers are white, pinkish in the bud stage, and 12–15 mm (0.47–0.59 in) wide. The sepals are hemispherical, less than 1 mm (0.039 in) long, the petals about 5 m (16 ft) long and the stamens are arranged in groups of about seven and 2 mm (0.079 in) long. Flowering occurs between October and January. The fruit is about 8 mm (0.31 in) in diameter with an almost flat top and with the sepals attached.

== Taxonomy and naming ==
'This species was first formally described in 1989 by Joy Thompson in the journal Telopea. In 2023, Peter Gordon Wilson transferred the species to the genus Gaudium as G. brevipes in the journal Taxon. The specific epithet (confertum) is from the Latin confertus, meaning "close together, crowded or dense", referring to the crowded leaves.

== Distribution and habitat ==
This tea-tree is found on slopes and in rocky gullies along the south coast on East Mount Barren in the Fitzgerald River National Park.

== Conservation status ==
Gaudium confertum is classified as "Priority Two" by the Western Australian Government Department of Parks and Wildlife meaning that it is poorly known and from only one or a few locations.
