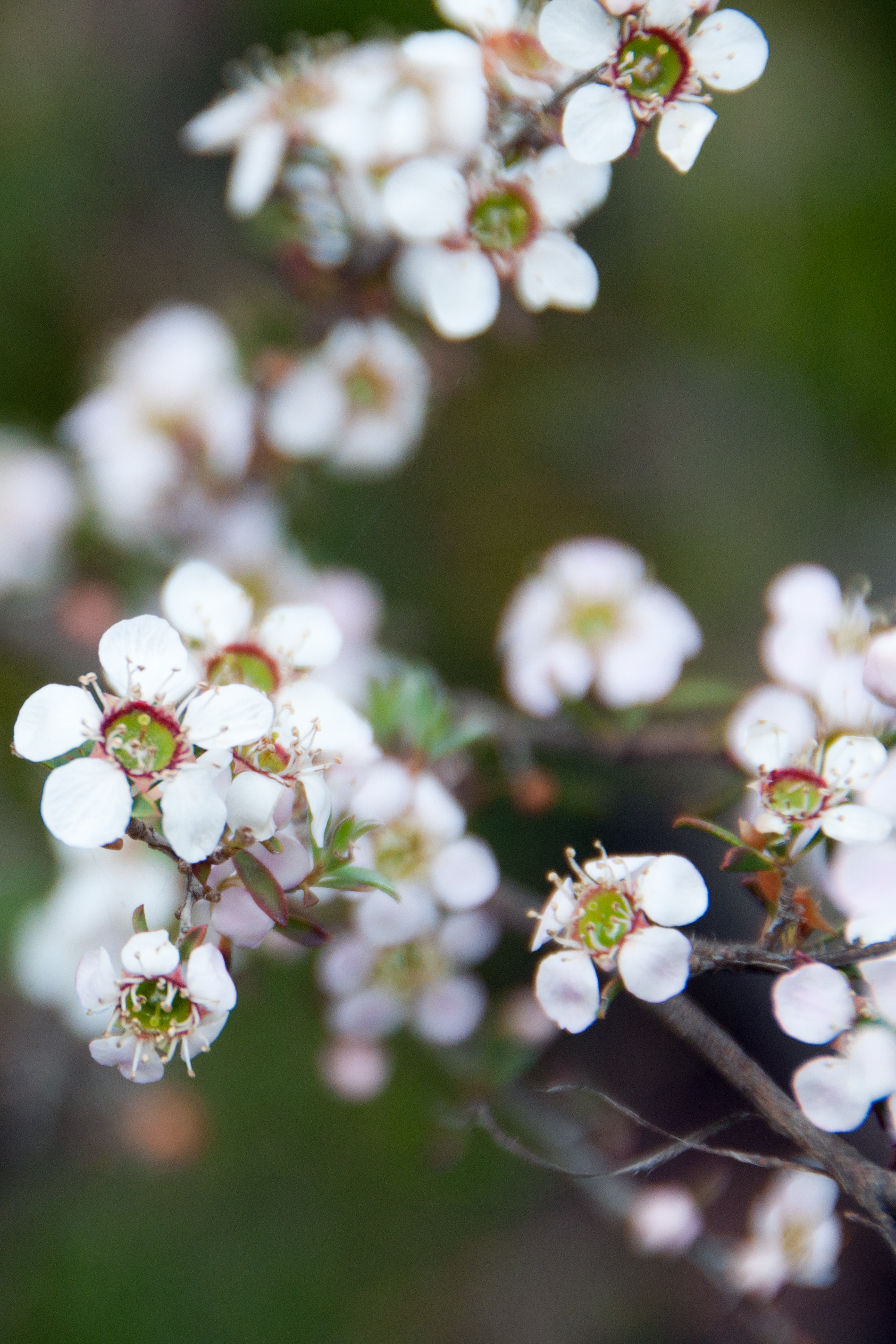

Scientific classification
- Kingdom: Plantae
- Clade: Tracheophytes
- Clade: Angiosperms
- Clade: Eudicots
- Clade: Rosids
- Order: Myrtales
- Family: Myrtaceae
- Genus: Gaudium
- Species: G. myrsinoides

Binomial name
- Gaudium myrsinoides (Schltdl.) Peter G.Wilson

Synonyms
- Leptospermum myrsinoides Schltdl.; Leptospermum myrsinoides var. angustifolium Miq.; Leptospermum myrsinoides var. latifolium Miq.

= Gaudium myrsinoides =

Heath tea-tree

Species of flowering plant

Gaudium myrsinoides, commonly known as the heath tea-tree or silky tea-tree, is a species of shrub that is endemic to south-eastern continental Australia. It has smooth bark on the younger stems, narrow egg-shaped leaves with the narrower end towards the base, white flowers and fruit that has the remains of the sepals attached but usually falls from the plant soon after the seeds are released.

== Description ==
Gaudium myrsinoides is a shrub that typically grows to a height of 1–2.5 m (3 ft 3 in – 8 ft 2 in). The older stems have stems with thin, firm bark and younger stems smooth bark that is hairy at first and later shed in stringy strips. The leaves are linear to narrow egg-shaped with the narrower end towards the base, 5–10 mm (0.20–0.39 in) long and 1–3 mm (0.039–0.118 in) wide, tapering to a very short petiole. The flowers are usually borne singly, sometimes in pairs on short side shoots, and are white 5–10 mm (0.20–0.39 in) wide and white. There are broad reddish brown bracts at the base of the flower bud but which usually fall off as the flower opens. The floral cup is about 4 mm (0.16 in) long on a very short pedicel and is usually silky-hairy only on the lower half. The sepals are about 0.5 mm (0.020 in) long, the petals 4–5 mm (0.16–0.20 in) long and the stamens less than 1 mm (0.039 in) long. Flowering mainly occurs from October to November and the fruit is a hemispherical capsule 4–6 mm (0.16–0.24 in) wide with the remains of the sepals attached, but which fall from the plant soon after the seeds are released.

== Taxonomy and naming ==
This species was first formally described in 1847 by German botanist Diederich von Schlechtendal who gave it the name Leptospermum myrsinoides in the journal Linnaea: ein Journal für die Botanik in ihrem ganzen Umfange, oder Beiträge zur Pflanzenkunde. In 2023, Peter Gordon Wilson transferred the species to the genus Gaudium as G. myrsinoides in the journal Taxon.

== Distribution and habitat ==
The heath tea-tree grows in heath and mallee from Eden on the far south coast of New South Wales to the Mount Lofty Ranges and Kangaroo Island and is widespread in Victoria.
