= Gaudium venustum =

Conservation status
- Vulnerable (NCA)

Scientific classification
- Kingdom: Plantae
- Clade: Tracheophytes
- Clade: Angiosperms
- Clade: Eudicots
- Clade: Rosids
- Order: Myrtales
- Family: Myrtaceae
- Genus: Gaudium
- Species: G. venustum

Binomial name
- Gaudium venustum (A.R.Bean) Peter G.Wilson

Synonyms
- Leptospermum venustum A.R.Bean

Species of flowering plant

Gaudium venustum is a species of spreading shrub that is endemic to Queensland. It has thin, rough, scaly bark, broadly elliptical leaves, deep pink flowers borne singly on side shoots and fruit that is fleshy and succulent at first.

== Description ==
Gaudium venustum is a spreading shrub that typically grows to a height of 1.5–2.5 m (4 ft 11 in – 8 ft 2 in) and has arching branches. The bark is thin, rough, grey and scaly and the young stems are covered with spreading hairs. The leaves are broadly elliptical, the same shade of green on both sides, 6–13 mm (0.24–0.51 in) long and 3–4 mm (0.12–0.16 in) wide and sessile or on a petiole up to 1 mm (0.039 in) long. The flowers are borne singly on short side branches and are deep pink, fading to light pink and 18–25 mm (0.71–0.98 in) wide. The floral cup is covered with silky hairs, 3–4 mm (0.12–0.16 in) long and sessile or on a very short pedicel, and the sepals are triangular and covered with soft hairs. The petals are more or less round and there are thirty to forty stamens. The fruit is a capsule that is fleshy and succulent at first, 6–7 mm (0.24–0.28 in) long and 7–8 mm (0.28–0.31 in) wide with the remains of the sepals attached.

== Taxonomy and naming ==
This species was first formally described in 1992 by Anthony Bean who gave it the name Leptospermum venustum in the journal Austrobaileya. In 2023, Peter Gordon Wilson transferred the species to the genus Gaudium as G. trinervium in the journal Taxon. The specific epithet (venustum) refers to "its very beautiful floral display".

== Distribution and habitat ==
This tea-tree grows on hills and slopes, sometimes near small streams in woodland and is restricted to a small area west of Eidsvold.

== Conservation status ==
This species is classified as "vulnerable" under the Queensland Government Nature Conservation Act 1992.
