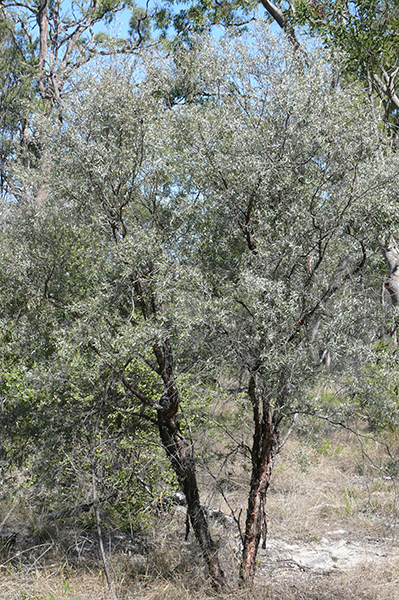
- In Carnarvon Station Reserve

Scientific classification
- Kingdom: Plantae
- Clade: Tracheophytes
- Clade: Angiosperms
- Clade: Eudicots
- Clade: Rosids
- Order: Myrtales
- Family: Myrtaceae
- Genus: Gaudium
- Species: G. lamellatum

Binomial name
- Gaudium lamellatum (Joy Thomps.) Peter G.Wilson
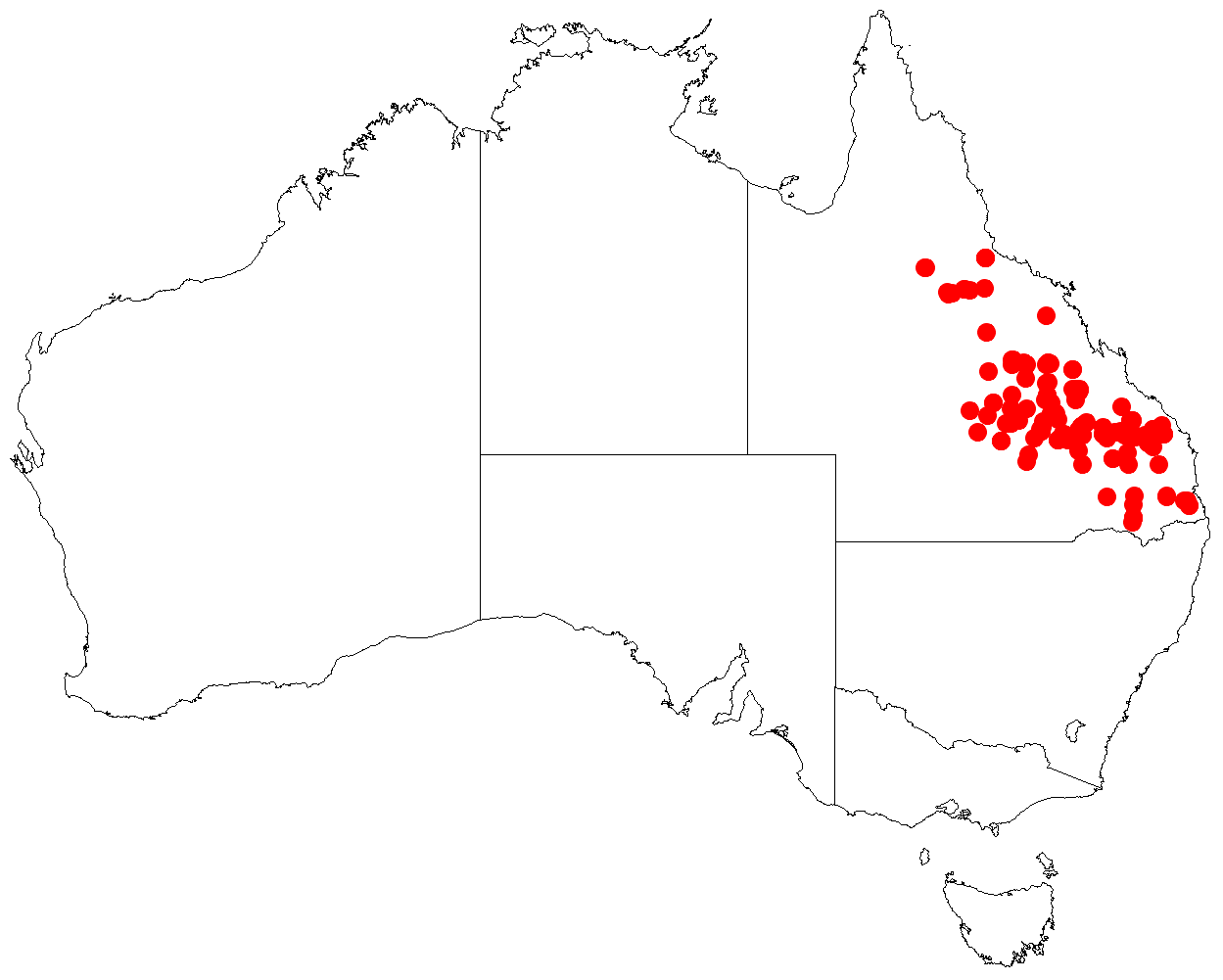
- Occurrence data from AVH

Synonyms
- Leptospermum lamellatum Joy Thomps

= Gaudium lamellatum =

Species of shrub

Gaudium lamellatum is a species of shrub or small tree that is endemic to inland Queensland and has distinctive reddish, layered bark. It has narrow elliptical leaves, white flowers and small fruit that fall from the plant when mature.

== Description ==
Gaudium lamellatum is a shrub that typically grows to a height of about 3 m (9.8 ft) or a tree to more than 5 m (16 ft). The main stems have layers of papery, reddish bark. Younger stems are thin and covered at first with silky hairs. The leaves are narrow elliptical, 10–40 mm (0.39–1.57 in) long and 1.5–4 mm (0.059–0.157 in) wide and often slightly curved. The flowers are white and are borne singly or in pairs on short side branches, and are 5–13 mm (0.20–0.51 in) wide on a pedicel 3–5 mm (0.12–0.20 in) long. The floral cup is ridged, about 2 mm (0.079 in) long, the sepals broadly egg-shaped and about 1 mm (0.039 in) long. The petals are 3–5 mm (0.12–0.20 in) long and the stamens 0.5–1.5 mm (0.020–0.059 in) long. Flowering mainly occurs from August to November and the fruit is a capsule 2–4 mm (0.079–0.157 in) in diameter with the remains of the sepals attached, but the fruit fall from the plant shortly after reaching maturity.

== Taxonomy ==
Gaudium lamellatum was first formally described in 1989 by Joy Thompson in the journal Telopea, based on plant material collected from Bedourie Station in 1963. In 2023, Peter Gordon Wilson transferred the species to the genus Gaudium as G. lamellatum in the journal Taxon. The specific epithet (lamellatum) refers to the unusual bark of this species.

== Distribution and habitat ==
This tea tree grows in woodland, among rocks and near watercourses in inland Queensland, from the White Mountains National Park to near Millmerran.
