= Gaudium microcarpum =

Scientific classification
- Kingdom: Plantae
- Clade: Tracheophytes
- Clade: Angiosperms
- Clade: Eudicots
- Clade: Rosids
- Order: Myrtales
- Family: Myrtaceae
- Genus: Gaudium
- Species: G. microcarpum

Binomial name
- Gaudium microcarpum (Cheel) Peter G.Wilson

Synonyms
- Leptospermum microcarpum Cheel

Species of shrub

Gaudium microcarpum is a species of shrub that is endemic to eastern Australia. It has elliptical to lance-shaped leaves with a sharp point on the tip, white flowers and small fruit that falls from the plant shortly after the seeds are released.

== Description ==
Gaudium microcarpum is a shrub that typically grows to a height of 1–2 m (3 ft 3 in – 6 ft 7 in) or higher. It has variable bark, sometimes thin, rough and fibrous, sometimes smooth. The leaves are elliptical to narrow lance-shaped with the narrower end towards the base but usually with a sharp point about 1 mm (0.039 in) long on the tip. The leaves are up to 20 mm (0.79 in) long and 4 mm (0.16 in) wide on a short but distinct petiole. The flowers are white, 8–12 mm (0.31–0.47 in) wide and arranged singly or in pairs on a short side shoot. There are broad reddish brown bracts at the base of the flower bud but which fall off before the flower opens. The floral cup is densely hairy, 2–3 mm (0.079–0.118 in) long, the sepals oblong to hemispherical about 1 mm (0.039 in) long, the petals 3–5 mm (0.12–0.20 in) long and the stamens 1–1.5 mm (0.039–0.059 in) long. Flowering mainly occurs from August to October and the fruit is a capsule 3–4 mm (0.12–0.16 in) wide, most of which are shed soon after the seeds are released.

== Taxonomy and naming ==
This species was first formally described in 1923 by Edwin Cheel who gve it the name Leptospermum microcarpum in the Journal and Proceedings of the Royal Society of New South Wales. In 2023, Peter Gordon Wilson transferred the species to the genus Gaudium as G. microcarpum in the journal Taxon. The specific epithet (microcarpum) is a Latin word meaning "small-fruited".

== Distribution and habitat ==
This tea-tree grows on rocky mountains and cliff edges between the Wide Bay district in Queensland and Ashford in northern New South Wales.
