= Gaudium (plant) =

Scientific classification
- Kingdom: Plantae
- Clade: Tracheophytes
- Clade: Angiosperms
- Clade: Eudicots
- Clade: Rosids
- Order: Myrtales
- Family: Myrtaceae
- Subfamily: Myrtoideae
- Tribe: Leptospermeae
- Genus: Gaudium; Peter G.Wilson

Genus of flowering plants

Gaudium is a genus of 22 species of flowering plants in the myrtle family Myrtaceae previously included in Leptospermum. It was first formally described by Peter Gordon Wilson and Margaret M. Heslewood in the journal Taxon. Approximately 20 other plants previously considered Leptospermum were reclassified into 3 other genera: Aggreflorum, Leptospermopsis and Apectospermum.

The name Gaudium is derived from the Latin for ‘joy’, named in homage to Joy Thompson. In 1989, she produced a complete revision of the genus Leptospermum.

== Species ==
The following is a list of species accepted by the Plants of the World Online as at August 2024.

- Gaudium blakelyi (Joy Thomps.) Peter G.Wilson (N.S.W.)
- Gaudium brevipes (F.Muell.) Peter G.Wilson – slender tea-tree (Qld, NSW, Vic)
- Gaudium confertum (Joy Thomps.) Peter G.Wilson (W.A.)
- Gaudium coriaceum (F.Muell.) Peter G.Wilson - green tea-tree, mallee teatree (N.S.W., Vic., S.A.)
- Gaudium deanei (Joy Thomps.) Peter G.Wilson – Deane's tea-tree (N.S.W.)
- Gaudium divaricatum (S.Schauer) Peter G.Wilson (N.S.W.)
- Gaudium glaucescens (S.Schauer) Peter G.Wilson – blue-green tea tree, smoky tea tree (Tas.)
- Gaudium jingera (Lyne & Crisp) Peter G.Wilson – stringybark tea-tree (Vic.)
- Gaudium laevigatum (Gaertn.) Peter G.Wilson – coast tea tree (N.S.W., Vic., S.A., Tas.)
- Gaudium lamellatum (Joy Thomps.) Peter G.Wilson (Qld.)
- Gaudium microcarpum (Cheel) Peter G.Wilson (Qld., N.S.W.)
- Gaudium multicaule (A.Cunn.) Peter G.Wilson – silver tea tree (N.S.W., A.C.T., Vic.)
- Gaudium myrsinoides (Schltdl.) Peter G.Wilson – heath tea-tree, silky tea-tree (N.S.W., Vic., S.A.)
- Gaudium namadgiense (Lyne) Peter G.Wilson (N.S.W., A.C.T.)
- Gaudium neglectum (Joy Thomps.) Peter G.Wilson (Qld.)
- Gaudium parvifolium (Sm.) Peter G.Wilson – lemon-scented tea-tree (Qld., N.S.W.)
- Gaudium polyanthum (Joy Thomps.) Peter G.Wilson (N.S.W.)
- Gaudium semibaccatum (Cheel) Peter G.Wilson (Qld., N.S.W.)
- Gaudium sericatum (Lindl.) Peter G.Wilson (Qld.)
- Gaudium subglabratum (Joy Thomps.) Peter G.Wilson (N.S.W.)
- Gaudium trinervium (J.White) Peter G.Wilson - flaky-barked tea-tree, slender tea-tree, paperbark tree (Qld., N.S.W., Vic.)
- Gaudium venustum (A.R.Bean) Peter G.Wilson (Qld.)
