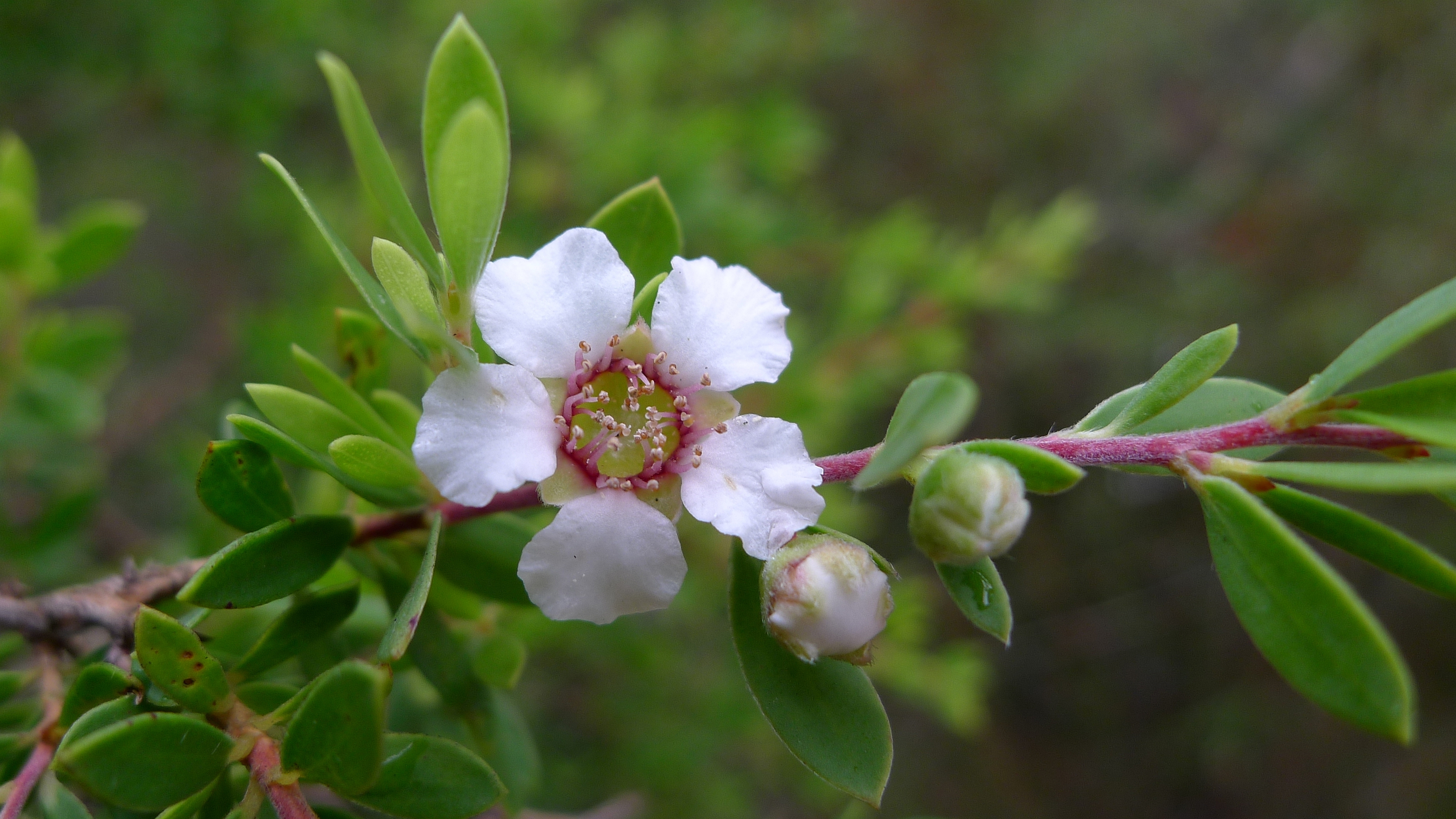
- In the Royal National Park

Scientific classification
- Kingdom: Plantae
- Clade: Tracheophytes
- Clade: Angiosperms
- Clade: Eudicots
- Clade: Rosids
- Order: Myrtales
- Family: Myrtaceae
- Genus: Gaudium
- Species: G. trinervium

Binomial name
- Gaudium trinervium (John White) (Peter G.Wilson)
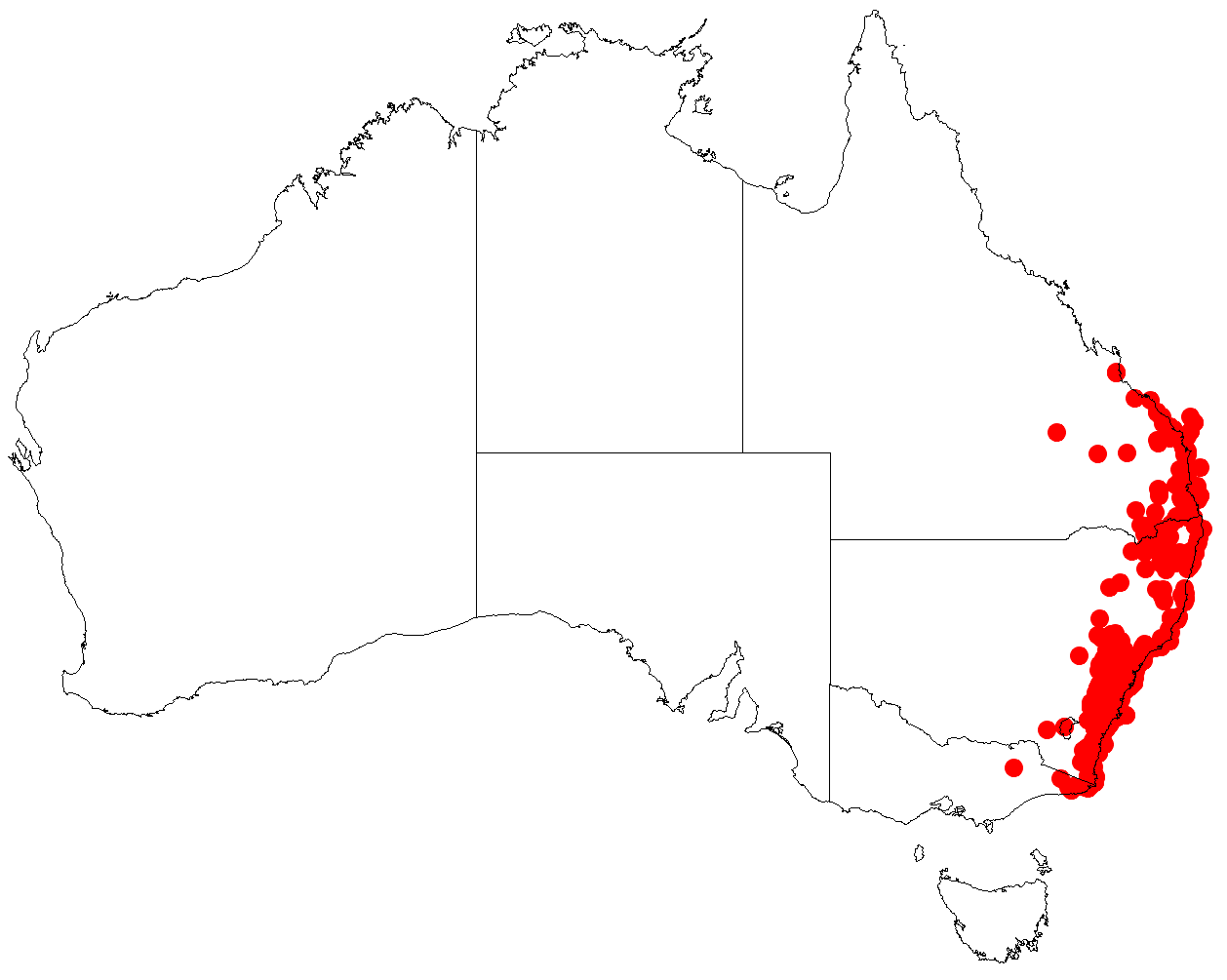
- Occurrence data from AVH

Synonyms
- List: Leptospermum trinervium (J.White) Joy Thomps.; Melaleuca trinervia J.White; Leptospermum acuminatum Reider; Leptospermum attenuatum Sm.; Leptospermum gnidiifolium DC.; Leptospermum lucidum S.Schauer; Leptospermum pendulum Spreng.; Leptospermum stellatum Cav.; Leptospermum stellatum f. angustifolium Domin; Leptospermum stellatum f. fallax Domin; Leptospermum stellatum var. grandiflorum Benth.; Leptospermum stellatum var. typicum Hochr. not validly publ.; Leptospermum trinerve Sm.

= Gaudium trinervium =

Flaky-barked tea-tree

Species of shrub

Gaudium trinervium, commonly known as flaky-barked tea-tree, slender tea-tree or paperbark tree, is a species of shrub or small tree that is endemic to eastern Australia. It has papery bark that is shed in thin, flaking layers, narrow elliptic to broadly egg-shaped leaves with the narrower at the base, white flowers and silky-hairy fruit that falls from the plant when mature.

== Description ==
Gaudium trinervium is a shrub or small tree that typically grows to a height of 2–6 m (6 ft 7 in – 19 ft 8 in) and has papery bark that is shed in thin, flaking strips. The leaves are narrow elliptical to broadly egg-shaped with the narrower end towards the base, 9–22 mm (0.35–0.87 in) long and 1–6 mm (0.039–0.236 in) wide, the tip usually blunt and the base tapering to a short petiole. The flowers are white, about 7–15 mm (0.28–0.59 in) wide and arranged singly or in pairs on the ends of short side shoots. The floral cup is densely covered with silky hairs, about 3 mm (0.12 in) long tapering to a pedicel of variable length. The sepals are also hairy, oblong to triangular, about 1.5–2.5 mm (0.059–0.098 in) long, the five petals 5–7 mm (0.20–0.28 in) long and the stamens 1.5–2 mm (0.059–0.079 in) long. Flowering mostly occurs from September to October near the coast and from November to December on the tablelands. The fruit is a capsule 3–6 mm (0.12–0.24 in) wide with the remains of the sepals attached and that falls the plant at maturity.

== Taxonomy ==
This tea-tree was first described in 1790 by John White who gave it the name Melaleuca trinervia and published the description in his Journal of a Voyage to New South Wales. In 2023, Peter Gordon Wilson transferred the species to the genus Gaudium as G. trinervium in the journal Taxon.

== Distribution and habitat ==
Flaky-barked tea-tree mainly grows in forest but is also found in heath and scrub, especially among sandstone rocks. It occurs on the coast and tablelands south from Rockhampton in Queensland through eastern New South Wales in near coastal scrubland and woodland in far eastern Victoria.

== Use in horticulture ==
Gaudium trinervium is a hardy, although not showy plant, the bark being its most unusual feature. It can be propagated from seed or from cuttings and is frost hardy.
