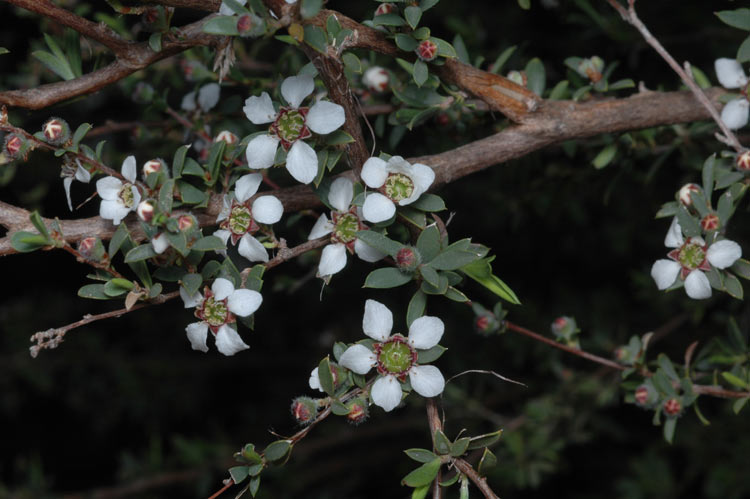
- In the Australian National Botanic Gardens

Scientific classification
- Kingdom: Plantae
- Clade: Tracheophytes
- Clade: Angiosperms
- Clade: Eudicots
- Clade: Rosids
- Order: Myrtales
- Family: Myrtaceae
- Genus: Gaudium
- Species: G. divaricatum

Binomial name
- Gaudium divaricatum (S.Schauer) Peter G.Wilson
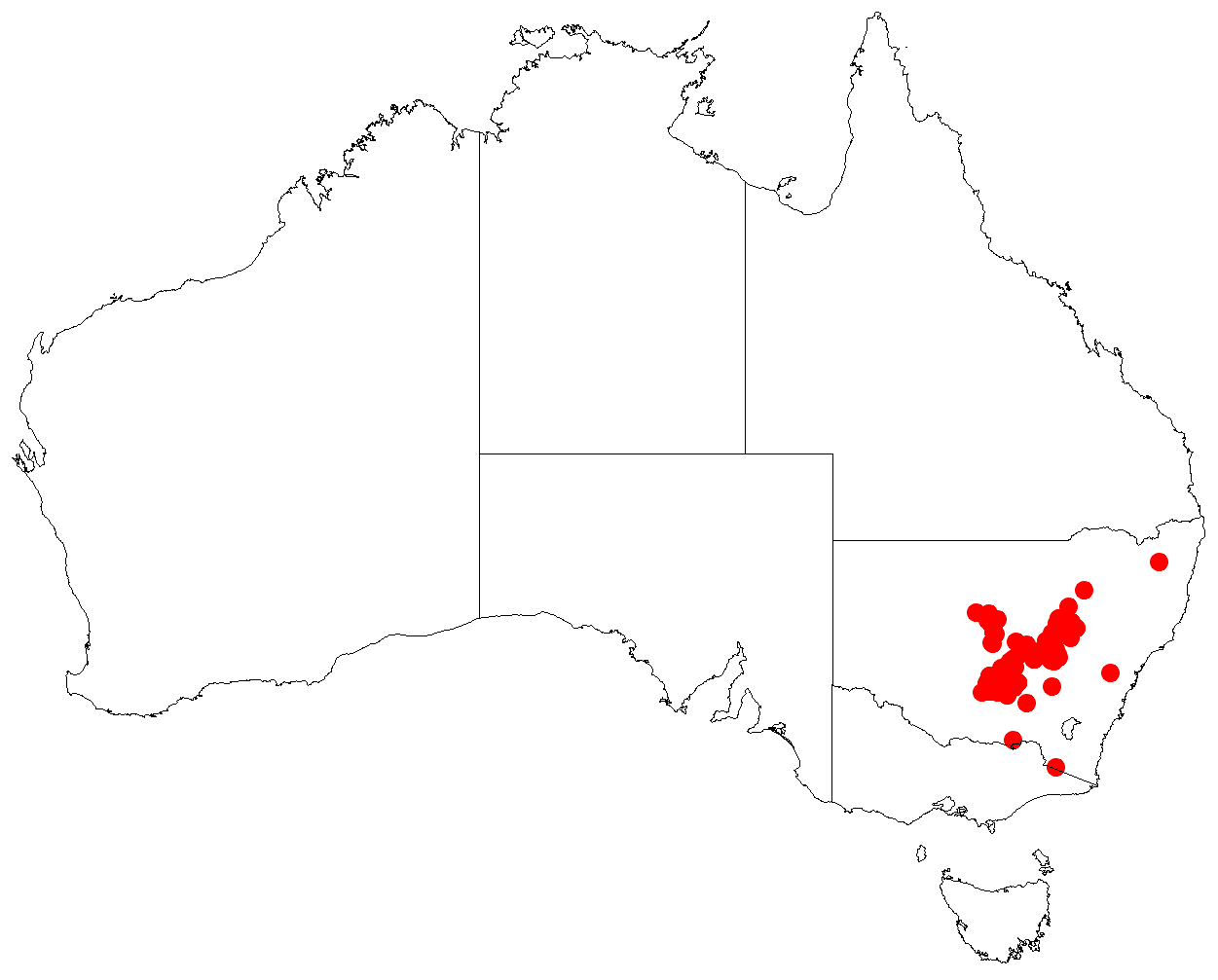
- Occurrence data from AVH

Synonyms
- Leptospermum divaricatum S.Schauer; Leptospermum trivalve Cheel

= Gaudium divaricatum =

Species of shrub

Gaudium divaricatum is a plant species endemic to inland New South Wales. It is an erect or weeping shrub with compact fibrous bark, elliptical to egg-shaped leaves, white flowers arranged singly on short axillary side shoots and woody fruit that fall off when mature.

== Description ==
Gaudium divaricatum is an erect or weeping shrub typically growing to a height of 1–4 m (3 ft 3 in – 13 ft 1 in) with multiple stems. Its older stems have rough, compact, fibrous bark while the younger stems are thin and covered with fine hairs. The leaves are elliptical to egg-shaped, mostly 2–7 mm (0.079–0.276 in) long and 1–2 mm (0.039–0.079 in) wide. The flowers are white, usually borne singly on short side branches, and are about 6–10 mm (0.24–0.39 in) in diameter. The floral cup is hairy on the lower part, about 2 mm (0.079 in) long on a pedicel 0.5–1.5 mm (0.020–0.059 in) long. The sepals are triangular, about 1 mm (0.039 in) long with a few hairs. The petals are 2.5–3.5 mm (0.098–0.138 in) long and the stamens are in bundles of between three and five and are about 1 mm (0.039 in) long. Flowering mainly occurs from August to October and the fruit is a woody capsule about 4 mm (0.16 in) in diameter that falls off when mature.

== Taxonomy ==
This species was formally described in 1843 by Sebastian Schauer who gave it the name Leptospermum divaricatum in Walper's book Repertorium Botanices Systematicae. In 2023, Peter Gordon Wilson transferred the species to the genus Gaudium as G. divaricatum in the journal Taxon. The specific epithet (divaricatum) is a Latin word meaning "widely spreading" or "forked".

== Distribution and habitat ==
Gaudium divaricatum grows in woodland and heath in mallee or on hillsides on the North West Slopes, Central Western Slopes and Western Plains of New South Wales, south from Nymagee.
