= Gaudium glaucescens =

Blue-green tea tree

Conservation status
- Least Concern (IUCN 3.1)

Scientific classification
- Kingdom: Plantae
- Clade: Tracheophytes
- Clade: Angiosperms
- Clade: Eudicots
- Clade: Rosids
- Order: Myrtales
- Family: Myrtaceae
- Genus: Gaudium
- Species: G. glaucescens

Binomial name
- Gaudium glaucescens (S.Schauer) Peter G.Wilson
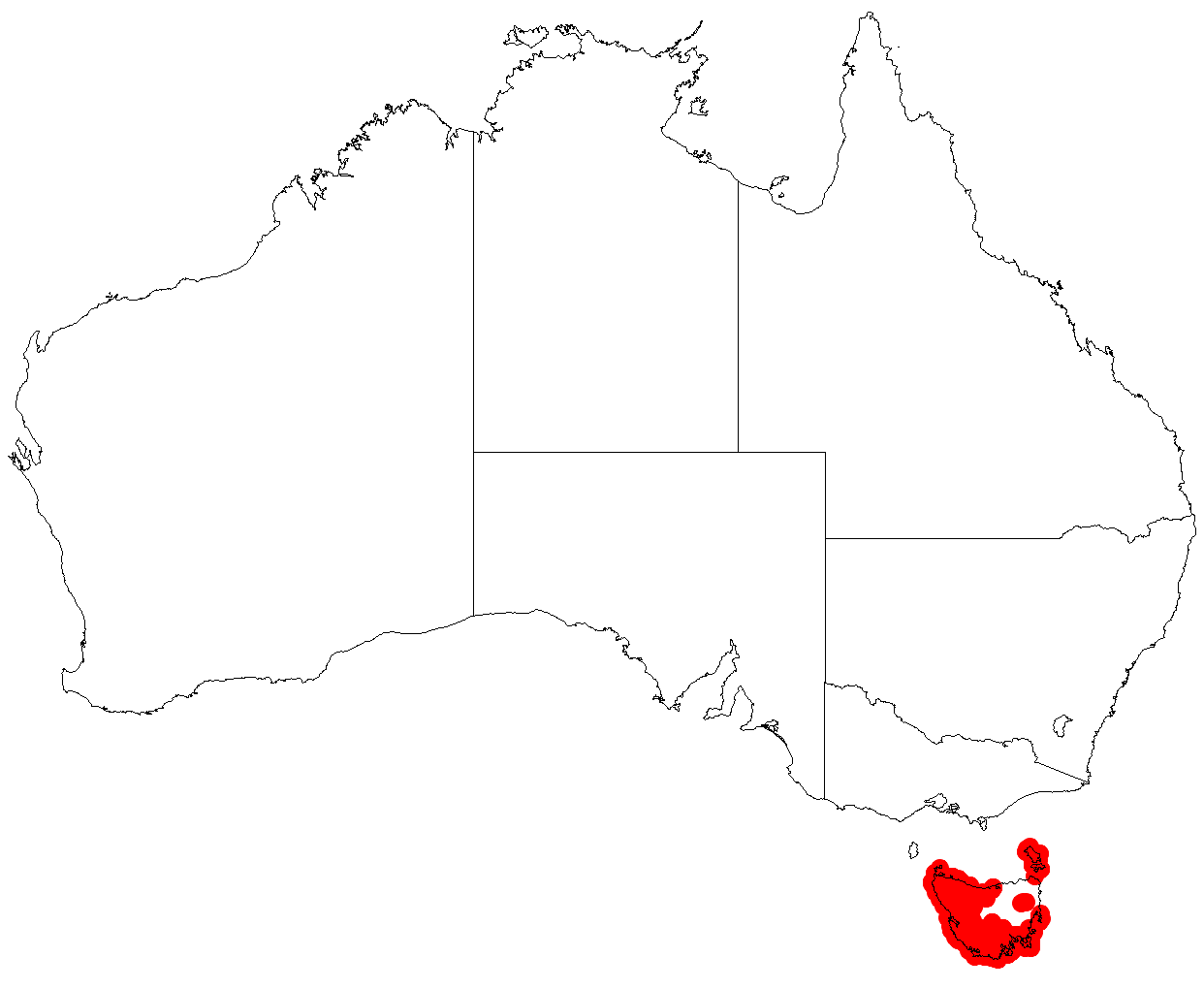
- Occurrence data from AVH

Synonyms
- Leptospermum glaucescens S.Schauer; Leptospermum erythrocarpum Summerh. & H.F.Comber; Eriostemon trinervis Hook.

Species of shrub

Gaudium glaucescens, commonly known as the blue-green tea tree or smoky tea tree, is a species of shrub or small tree that is endemic to Tasmania. It has elliptical to egg-shaped leaves that are often greyish green, white flowers about 15 mm (0.59 in) in diameter arranged in consecutive leaf axils and fruit that remain on the plant for some time after maturity.

== Description ==
Gaudium glaucescens is a shrub or small tree that has flaky bark and young stems that are hairy when young. It has elliptical to egg-shaped leaves with the narrower end towards the base, mostly about 10 mm (0.39 in) long, 3–6 mm (0.12–0.24 in) wide and often greyish green, tapering to a petiole about 1 mm (0.039 in) long. The flowers are arranged singly in consecutive leaf axils on a stout pedicel and are about 15 mm (0.59 in) in diameter. There are broad, brownish bracts at the base of the flower bud but that fall off as the flower develops. The floral cup is 3–3.5 mm (0.12–0.14 in) long and usually densely hairy. The sepals are broadly egg-shaped to triangular, 1.5–2.5 mm (0.059–0.098 in) long, the petals white, 4–7 mm (0.16–0.28 in) long and the stamens about 1.5 mm (0.059 in) long. Flowering occurs from January to February and the fruit is a capsule 4–5 mm (0.16–0.20 in) wide, remains on the plant for some time after maturity and has the sepals attached.

== Taxonomy and naming ==
This species was first formally described in 1841 by Sebastian Schauer who gave it the name Leptospermum glaucescens in the journal Linnaea: ein Journal für die Botanik in ihrem ganzen Umfange, oder Beiträge zur Pflanzenkunde. Schauer's description was based on specimens grown in the botanic garden in Breslau from seed donated by Berlin Botanic Garden, but extensive searches have failed to locate Schauer's type specimens. The neotype is "virgate shrubs to 3 m (9.8 ft) high dominating damp sandy heathland" at the western foot of the Strzelecki Peaks on the south-west of Flinders Island in Tasmania.

In 1806, Jacques Labillardière described Leptospermum sericeum in Novae Hollandiae Plantarum Specimen from specimens collected "in capite Van-Diemen" and this name was applied to plants collected in Tasmania. However, Labillardière had confused "Van-Diemen" with "Terre Van-Leuwin", and although he later made the correction on the herbarium sheet in Paris, the name L. sericeum continued to be applied to plants collected in Tasmania. Although in 1844 Johannes Conrad Schauer noted in Plantae Preissianae (in Latin) "in Van Leuwin's Land, not on Van Diemen's Island", the correction was not made until 1967 with the publication of James Hamlyn Willis's paper in the journal Muelleria. Leptospermum sericeum is a Western Australian endemic, found near Esperance, which has pink, sessile flowers and does not grow to the height of L. glaucescens.

In 2023, Peter Gordon Wilson transferred the species to the genus Gaudium as G. glaucescens in the journal Taxon.

== Distribution and habitat ==
The blue-green tea tree grows in wet heath and is widespread in Tasmania.
