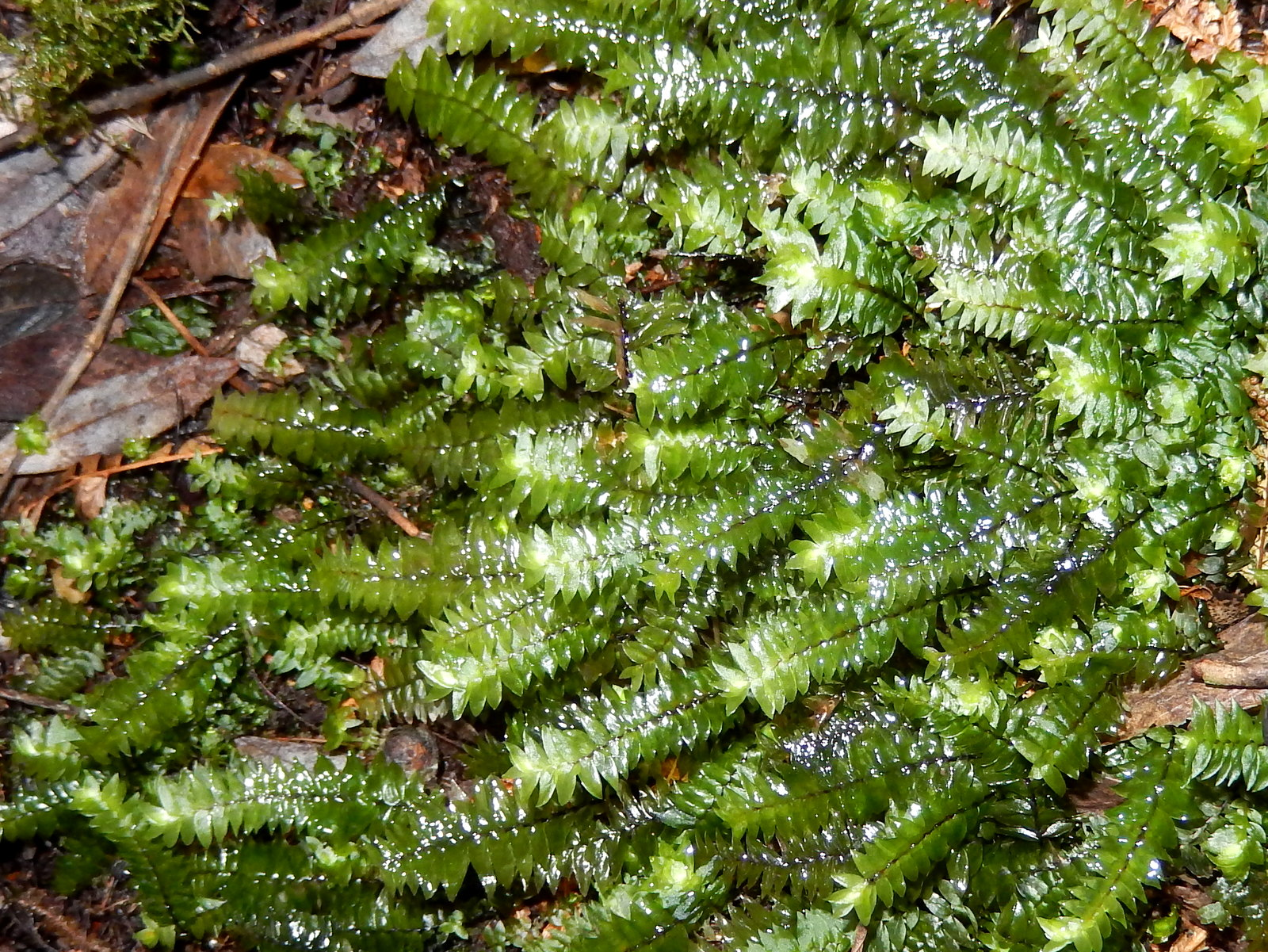
- Brown Mountain (New South Wales), Australia

Scientific classification
- Kingdom: Plantae
- Division: Bryophyta
- Class: Bryopsida
- Subclass: Bryidae
- Order: Hypopterygiales
- Family: Hypopterygiaceae
- Genus: Cyathophorum
- Species: C. bulbosum

Binomial name
- Cyathophorum bulbosum (Hedw.) Müll. Hal.

= Cyathophorum bulbosum =

Species of moss

Cyathophorum bulbosum, commonly known as quill moss or the false fern moss, is found in the eastern states of Australia (QLD, NSW, VIC, TAS and south-eastern SA) as well as Papua New Guinea, New Zealand, Auckland Islands, Chatham Island, Lord Howe Island and possibly Norfolk Island and New Ireland.

== Taxonomy ==
Cyathophorum bulbosum was first described by Johann Hedwig, a German botanist in 1801 in the publication ‘Species Muscorum Frondosorum’. In 1851 it was then re described by Johann Karl Müller and given the current name.

It belongs in the family Hypopterygiaceae along with other genus such as Hypopterygium (umbrella moss) and Lopidium. Members of this family are characterized by having flattened shoots and leaves in three rows, which is similar to many leafy liverworts.

== Description ==
Cyathophorum bulbosum is often mistaken for a small fern due to its appearance. The stem can grow up to 20 cm, although is generally found around the 5–15 cm range, with the longer specimens found in Tasmania and Victoria. Stems are generally single shoots with distichous (evenly paired) and complanate (flattened) leaf arrangement, although it is not uncommon to find the occasional forked stem.

They grow in an almost horizontal angle, forming beautiful overlapping clumps. They also have a smaller, rounder row of leaves on the underside, however this can also trick some people into thinking it is a leafy liverwort. Upon closer inspection of the leaves with a hand lens, there will be a short costa (mid vein nerve), which immediately rules out liverworts. However, some leafy liverworts have a one cell thick, mid leaf line, a vitta.

Sporophytes are born on the underside of the plant, running evenly down the stem. The capsules are subglobose to ellipsoidal in shape with a fleshy, pale to dark brown calyptra. They are borne on a very short setae (stalk). The operculum is long-rostrate, which means it has an apical beak narrowing to a slender tip.

Cyathophorum bulbosum is dioicous, meaning that male and females are separate ‘plants’.The life cycle is dominated by the gametophyte stage. There are no other moss species within Australia that look similar. Though it may be confused with Schistochila lehmanniana.

== Distribution and habitat ==
Cyathophorum bulbosum is found growing on soil, rocks, the bases of trees, rotting logs and the trunks of tree ferns. It prefers a moist and shaded site, generally close to streams or continuous water sources. Common in temperate rainforest and wet sclerophyll forest.

It is the only species of Cyathophorum present in Australia.
