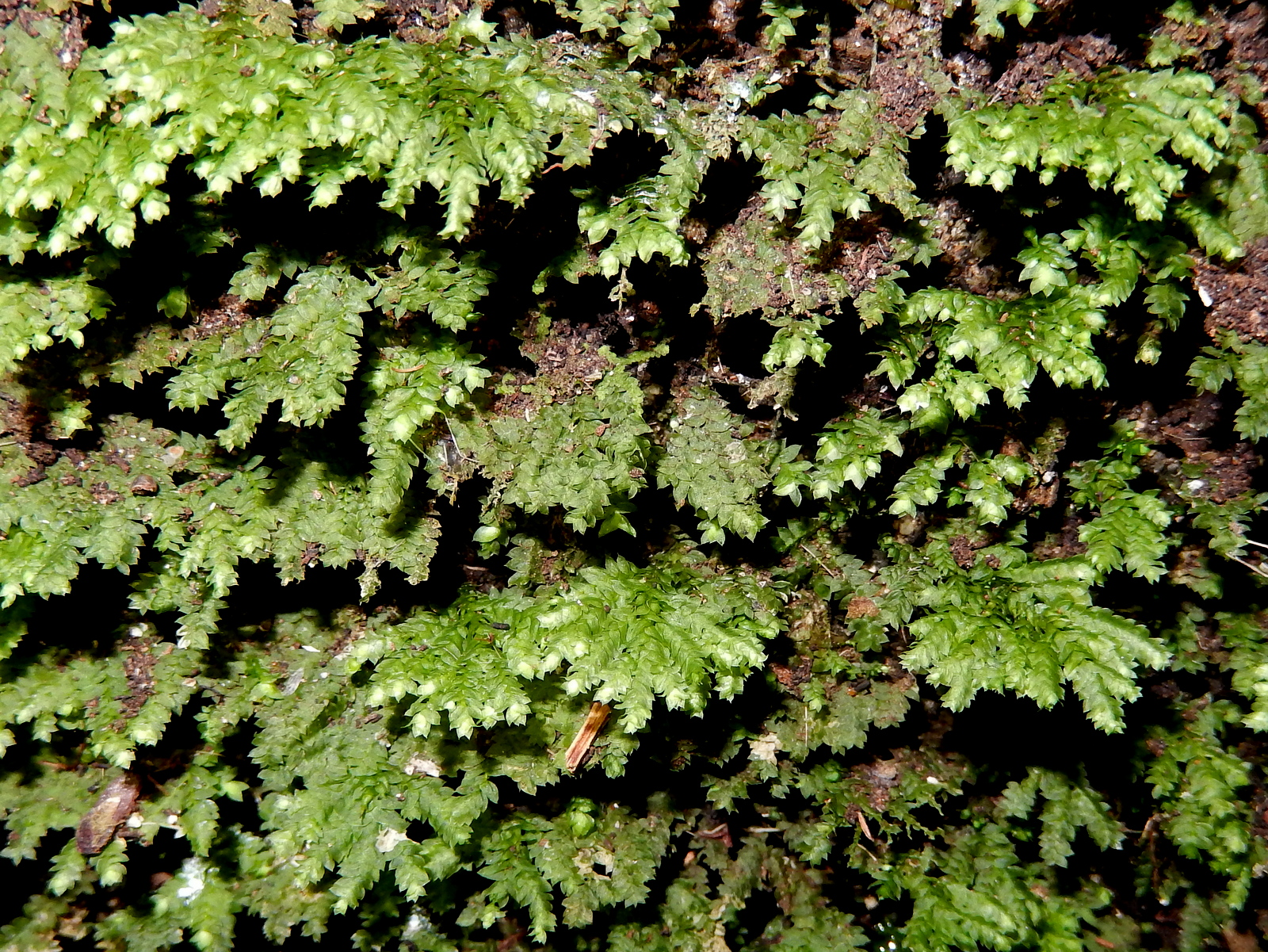
- moss at Ferndale Park, Sydney, Australia

Scientific classification
- Kingdom: Plantae
- Division: Bryophyta
- Class: Bryopsida
- Subclass: Bryidae
- Order: Hypopterygiales
- Family: Hypopterygiaceae
- Genus: Hypopterygium
- Species: H. tamarisci

Binomial name
- Hypopterygium tamarisci (Sw.) Brid. ex Müll.Hal.

= Hypopterygium tamarisci =

Species of moss

Hypopterygium tamarisci is a species of moss in the family Hypopterygiaceae.
