= Leptospermopsis roei =

Scientific classification
- Kingdom: Plantae
- Clade: Tracheophytes
- Clade: Angiosperms
- Clade: Eudicots
- Clade: Rosids
- Order: Myrtales
- Family: Myrtaceae
- Genus: Leptospermopsis
- Species: L. roei

Binomial name
- Leptospermopsis roei (Benth.) Peter G.Wilson

Synonyms
- Leptospermum roei Benth.; Leptospermum inelegans Joy Thomps.

Species of shrub

Leptospermopsis roei is a species of spreading shrub that is endemic to the southwest of Western Australia. It has thin, fibrous bark, long egg-shaped to narrow wedge-shaped leaves, white or pink flowers and small fruit that are shed with the seeds.

== Description ==
Leptospermopsis roei is a spreading shrub with thin, fibrous bark and erect branches, the younger stems with silky hairs, at least at first. The leaves are an elongated egg shape to narrow wedge shape, 7–13 mm (0.28–0.51 in) long and 2–3 mm (0.079–0.118 in) wide, tapering to a petiole up to 1 mm (0.039 in) long. The flowers are white or pink, mostly 10–13 mm (0.39–0.51 in) wide and are arranged singly or in pairs on short side shoots. The flower buds have a few pale reddish brown bracts and bracteoles at the base but that fall off well before the flower opens. The floral cup is about 3–4 mm (0.12–0.16 in) long and densely covered with silky hairs, and tapers to a pedicel 1.5–2.5 mm (0.059–0.098 in) long. The sepals are 1–1.5 mm (0.039–0.059 in) long and are not differentiated from the floral cup except in their darker colour. The petals are about 5 mm (0.20 in) long and the stamens about 2 mm (0.079 in) long. Flowering mainly occurs from August to October and the fruit is a capsule usually about 2.5–3 mm (0.098–0.118 in) long with the remnants of the sepals attached, but that falls from the plant when the seeds mature.

== Taxonomy and naming ==
This species was first formally described in 1867 by George Bentham who gave it the name Leptospermum roei in Flora Australiensis. In 2023, Peter Gordon Wilson transferred the species to the genus Leptospermopsis as L. roei in the journal Taxon.

== Distribution and habitat ==
This teatree grows on sand, on gravel or on granite outcrops in the Avon Wheatbelt, Coolgardie and Mallee biogeographic regions.

== Conservation status ==
This leptospermum is listed as "not threatened" by the Western Australian Government Department of Parks and Wildlife.
