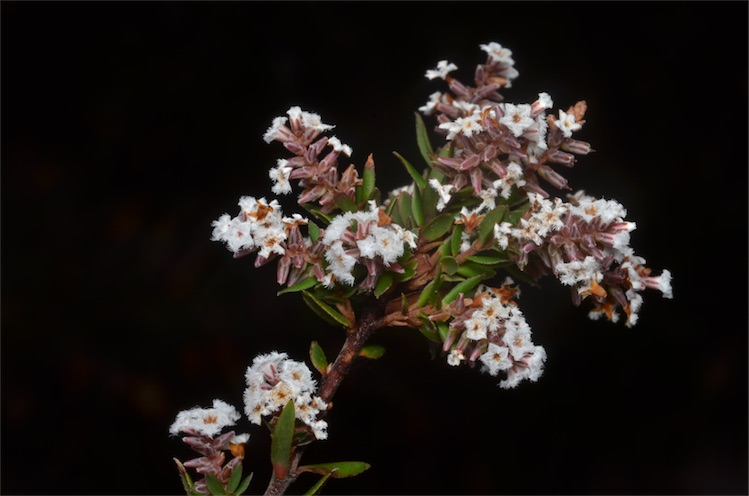
- Near Port Arthur, Tasmania

Scientific classification
- Kingdom: Plantae
- Clade: Tracheophytes
- Clade: Angiosperms
- Clade: Eudicots
- Clade: Asterids
- Order: Ericales
- Family: Ericaceae
- Genus: Leucopogon
- Species: L. collinus

Binomial name
- Leucopogon collinus (Labill.) R.Br.
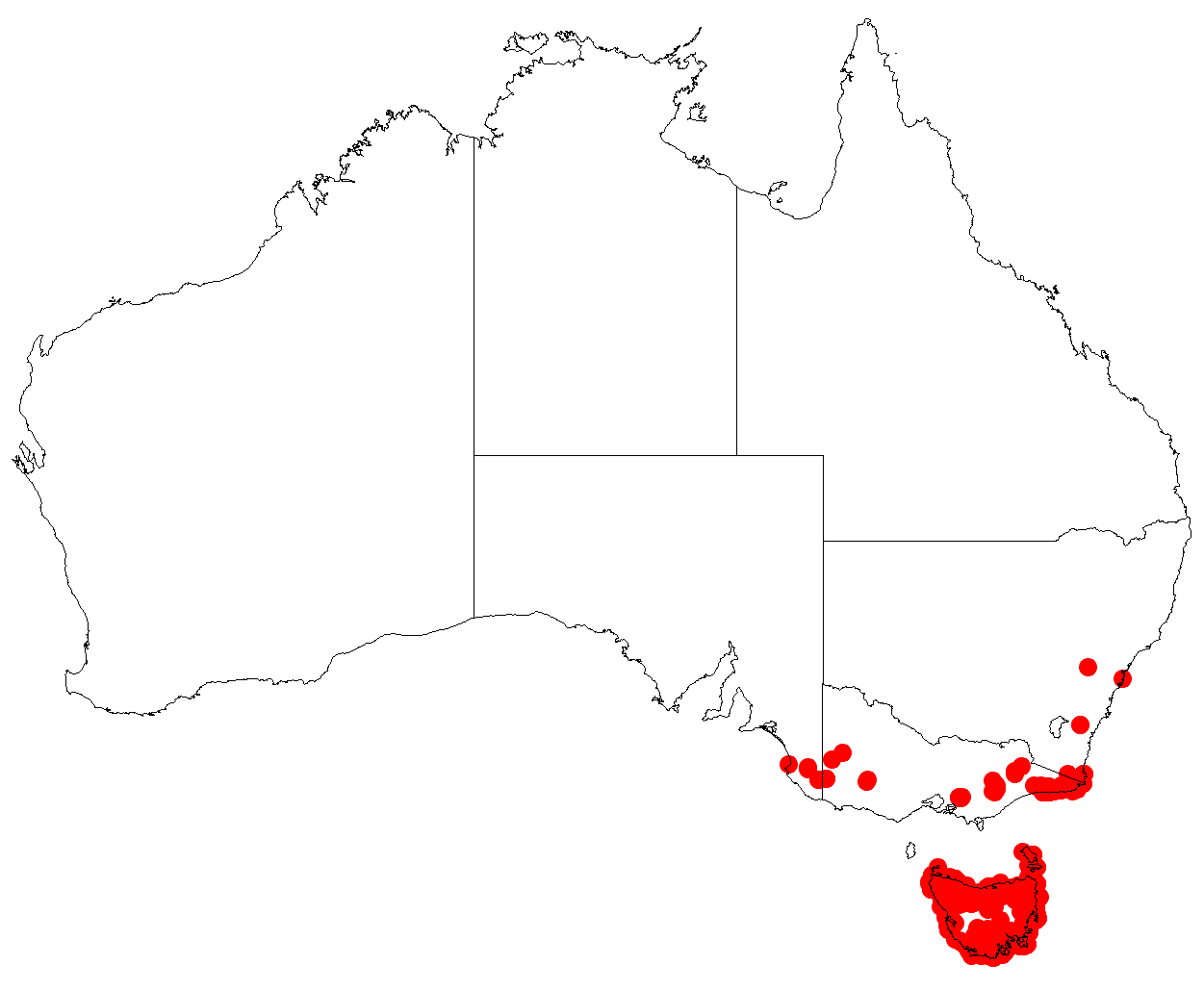
- Occurrence data from AVH

Synonyms
- List: Leucopogon ciliatus A.Cunn. ex DC.; Leucopogon ciliatus var. α; Leucopogon collinus (Labill.) R.Br. f. collinus; Leucopogon collinus var. billardierei DC. nom. illeg.; Leucopogon collinus var. brownii DC.; Leucopogon collinus (Labill.) R.Br. var. collinus; Leucopogon collinus var. α; Leucopogon collinus var. β; Leucopogon collinus var. δ; Leucopogon sp. A (aff. collinus); Styphelia collina Labill.

= Leucopogon collinus =

Species of plant

Leucopogon collinus, commonly known as fringed beard-heath, is a species of flowering plant in the heath family Ericaceae and is endemic to south-eastern Australia. It is a slender, erect or spreading shrub with narrowly lance-shaped leaves, and white, tube-shaped, bearded flowers.

== Description ==
Leucopogon collinus is a slender, erect or spreading shrub that typically grows to a height of up to 60 cm (24 in), its branchlets with minute, bristly hairs. Its leaves are glabrous, narrowly lance-shaped to oblong, 3–13.4 mm (0.12–0.53 in) long and 0.9–2.7 mm (0.035–0.106 in) wide on a petiole 0.3–1 mm (0.012–0.039 in) long. The flowers are crowded on the ends of branches or in upper leaf axils forming spikes 5–13 mm (0.20–0.51 in) long with egg-shaped bracteoles 0.7–1.7 mm (0.028–0.067 in) long. The sepals are egg-shaped, 1.3–2 mm (0.051–0.079 in) long, the petals white and joined at the base to form a tube 0.8–1.4 mm (0.031–0.055 in) long, the lobes 1.3–1.6 mm (0.051–0.063 in) long and densely bearded on the inside. Flowering occurs from July to October and is followed by an elliptic drupe about 2.5 mm (0.1 in) long.

== Taxonomy and naming ==
Fringed beard-heath was first formally described in 1810 by Jacques Labillardière, who gave it the name Styphelia collina in his Novae Hollandiae Plantarum Specimen. In the same year, Robert Brown changed the name to Leucopogon collinus in his Prodromus Florae Novae Hollandiae et Insulae Van Diemen. The specific epithet (collinus) means "living on hills".

== Distribution and habitat ==
Leucopogon collinus grows in woodland and coastal heath and is found south from Eden in New South Wales, in coastal areas east of Orbost and other scattered locations further westwards in inland Victoria, and is common and widespread in Tasmania.
