= Leioproctus cristativentris =

Scientific classification
- Kingdom: Animalia
- Phylum: Arthropoda
- Clade: Pancrustacea
- Class: Insecta
- Order: Hymenoptera
- Family: Colletidae
- Genus: Leioproctus
- Species: L. cristativentris

Binomial name
- Leioproctus cristativentris Batley, 2025

Species of bee

Leioproctus cristativentris, or Leioproctus (Euryglossidia) cristativentris, is a species of bee in the family Colletidae and subfamily Colletinae. It is endemic to Australia. It was described by entomologist Michael Batley in 2025.

== Etymology ==
The specific epithet cristativentris (Latin: "with a tufted venter") is an anatomical reference to the ventral metasoma of the male.

== Description ==
The male body length is about 10 mm, female body length 10.8 mm. Integumental colouration is mainly black with weak blue iridescence. The hair is white and brown.

== Distribution and habitat ==
The species occurs in inland south-west Western Australia. The type locality is 70 km north-east of Wubin in the northern Wheatbelt.

== Behaviour ==
The adults are flying mellivores. Flowering plants visited by the bees include Leptospermopsis erubescens.

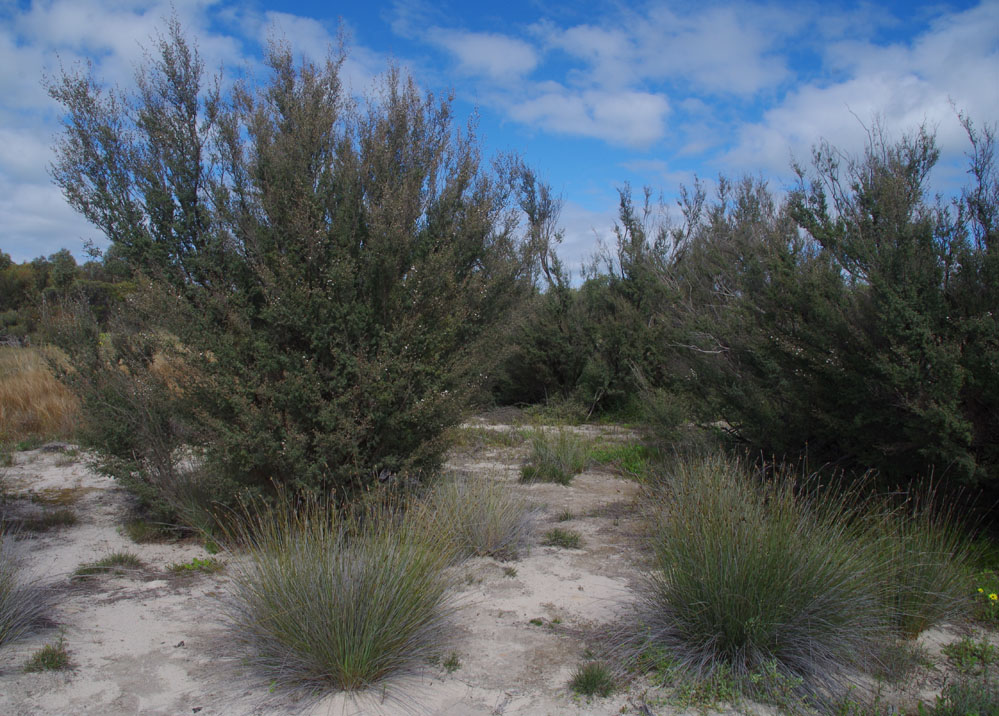
Leptospermopsis erubescens (roadside tea-tree), a forage plant of the bees

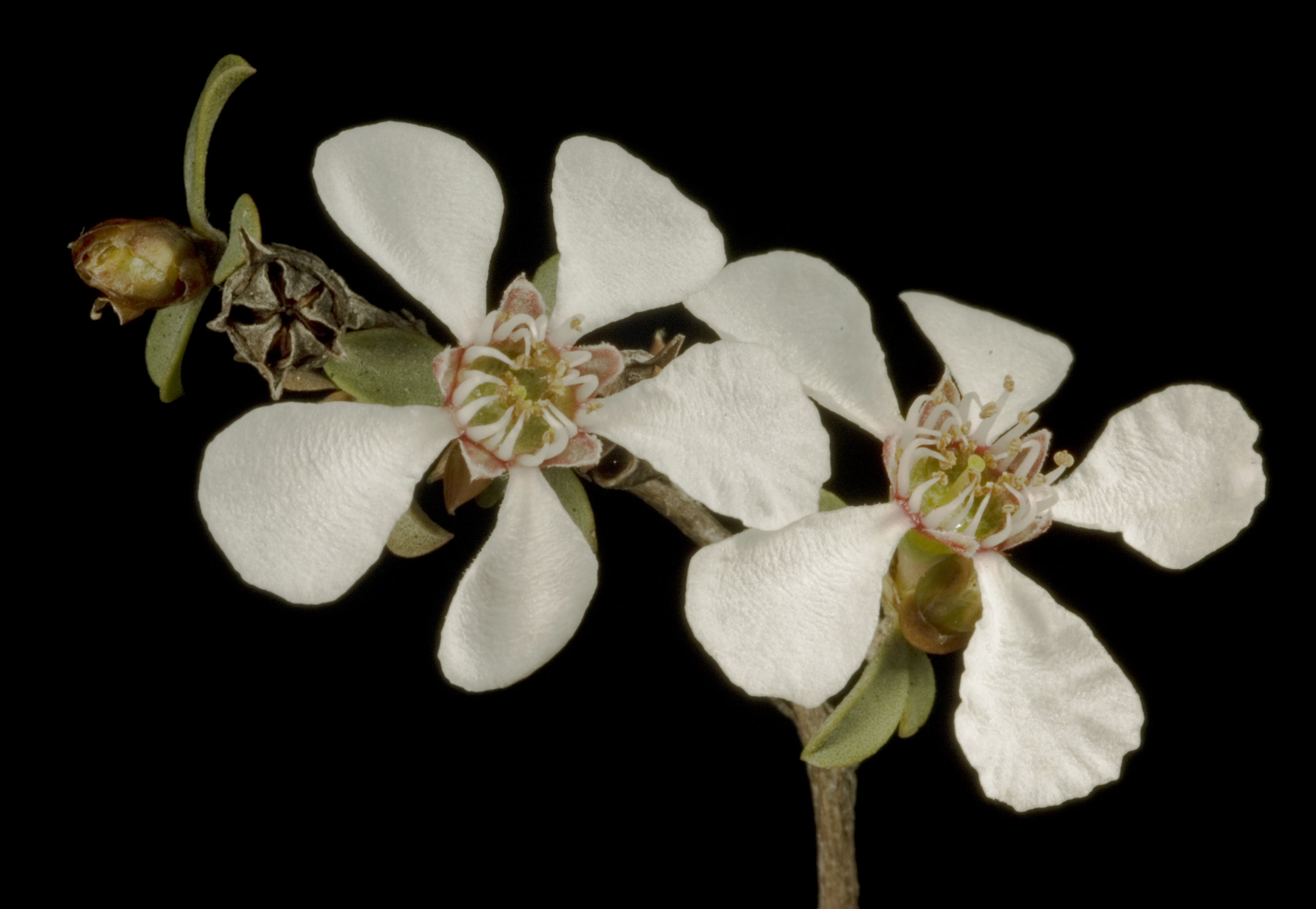
Flowers of Leptospermopsis erubescens
