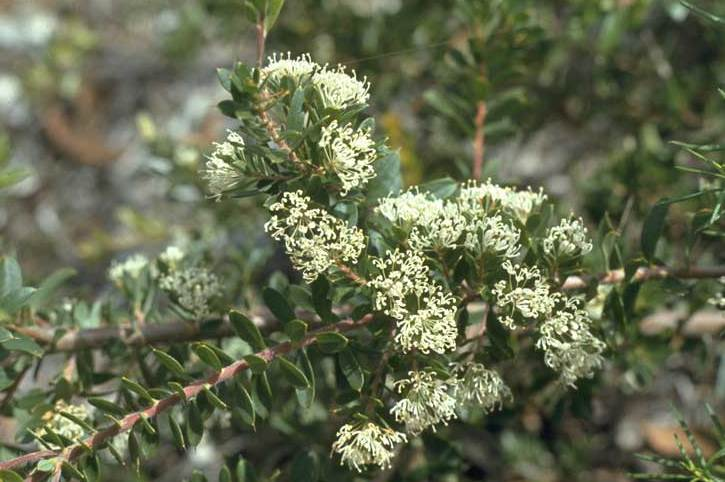
- Hakea ruscifolia in the ANBG

Scientific classification
- Kingdom: Plantae
- Clade: Tracheophytes
- Clade: Angiosperms
- Clade: Eudicots
- Order: Proteales
- Family: Proteaceae
- Genus: Hakea
- Species: H. ruscifolia

Binomial name
- Hakea ruscifolia Labill.
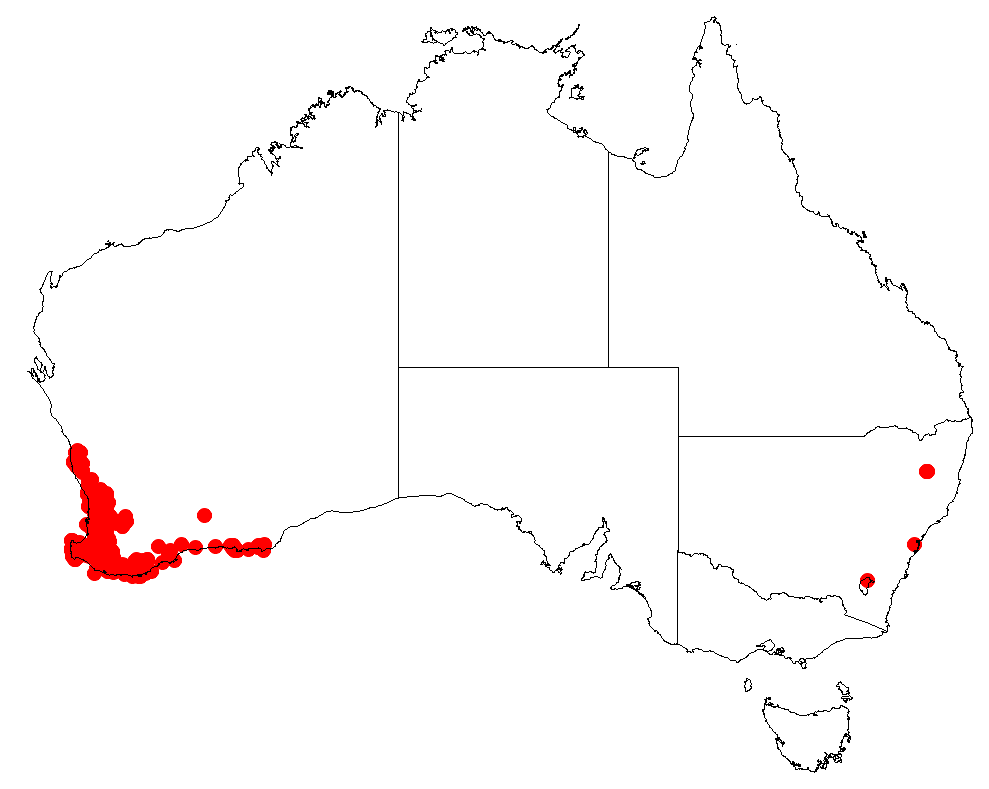
- Occurrence data from Australasian Virtual Herbarium

= Hakea ruscifolia =

Species of shrub endemic to Western Australia

Hakea ruscifolia, commonly known as the candle hakea, is a shrub in the family Proteaceae. It has fragrant white flowers, arching branches and spiky foliage. It is endemic to an area in the Peel, Wheatbelt South West, Great Southern and the Goldfields–Esperance regions of Western Australia.

== Description ==
Hakea ruscifolia is a dense shrub typically growing to 0.5 to 3 metres (2 to 10 ft) high, 1.5–2 m (5–7 ft) wide and forms a lignotuber. Usually branches grow in a columnar habit where the flowers envelop the stems. It blooms from December to June and produces sweetly scented white flowers in leaf axils on short lateral outer branchlets. Thickly crowded leaves are small and elliptic to obovate ending with a fine sharp point. Most leaves are 2–4 cm (0.8–2 in) long by under 1–2 cm (0.4–0.8 in) wide. The relatively small fruit are smooth, compressed and ovoid shaped 1–2 cm (0.4–0.8 in) long by under 1 cm (0.4 in) wide ending with a small beak.

== Taxonomy and naming ==
Hakea ruscifolia was first formally described by Jacques Labillardiere in 1805 and the description was published in Novae Hollandiae Plantarum Specimen. Named from the genus Ruscus, of the lily family, and from the Latin folium 'leaf'.

== Distribution and habitat ==
Candle hakea is a widespread coastal and inland species from Eneabba to Augusta and in the east to Esperance. It grows in heath and scrubland on sand, gravelly clay and laterite. A hardy ornamental species which is tolerant of moderate frost and a good understory shrub.

== Conservation status ==
Hakea ruscifolia is classified as "not threatened" by the Western Australian Government Department of Parks and Wildlife.
