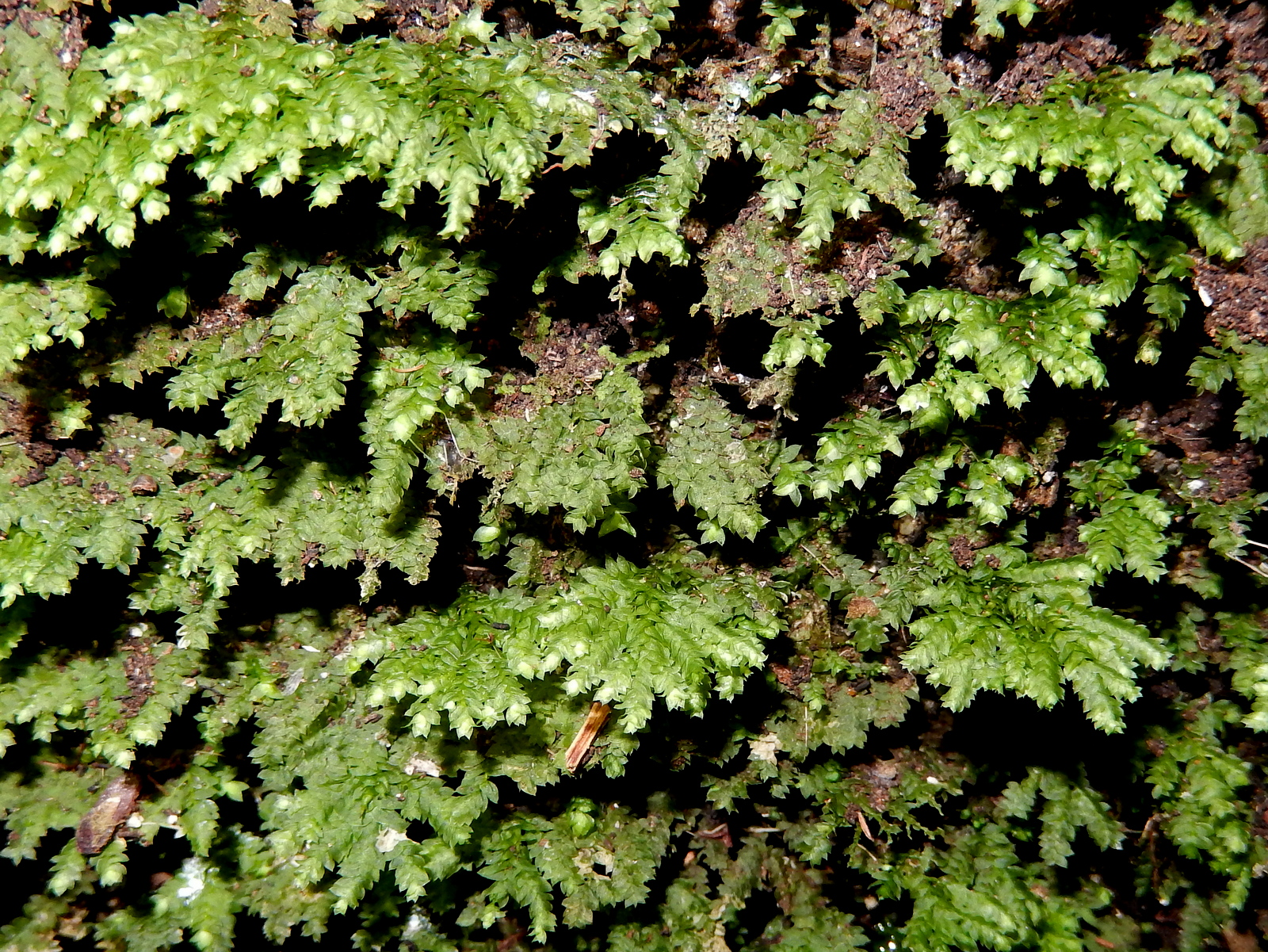
- Moss at Ferndale Park, Sydney, Australia

Scientific classification
- Kingdom: Plantae
- Division: Bryophyta
- Class: Bryopsida
- Subclass: Bryidae
- Order: Hypopterygiales
- Family: Hypopterygiaceae
- Genus: Hypopterygium; Brid.

Species
- See text

= Hypopterygium =

Genus of mosses

Hypopterygium is a genus of moss in the family Hypopterygiaceae. It contains the following species:

- Hypopterygium arbuscula Brid.
- Hypopterygium arcuatum (Hedw.) Müll. Hal.
- Hypopterygium balantii (Kindb.) Müll. Hal. ex Loeske
- Hypopterygium ciliatum (Hedw.) Brid.
- Hypopterygium concinnum (Hook.) Brid.
- Hypopterygium convolutaceum Müll. Hal.
- Hypopterygium didictyon Müll. Hal.
- Hypopterygium discolor Mitt.
- Hypopterygium elatum Tixier
- Hypopterygium filiculaeforme (Hedw.) Brid.
- Hypopterygium flavolimbatum Müll. Hal.
- Hypopterygium hildebrandtii (Kindb.) Müll. Hal. ex Paris
- Hypopterygium hookerianum (Griff.) A.J. Shaw, I. Holz, C. J. Cox & Goffinet
- Hypopterygium javanicum (Hampe) A. Jaeger
- Hypopterygium lutescens Hornsch.
- Hypopterygium pallens (Hook. f. & Wilson) Mitt.
- Hypopterygium parvifolium (Bosch & Sande Lac.) A.J. Shaw, I. Holz, C. J. Cox & Goffinet
- Hypopterygium pinnatum (Hampe) A. Jaeger
- Hypopterygium rotulatum (Hedw.) Brid.
- Hypopterygium sandwicense Broth.
- Hypopterygium spectabile (Reinw. & Hornsch.) Müll. Hal.
- Hypopterygium struthiopteris (Brid.) Brid.
- Hypopterygium tamarisci (Sw.) Brid. ex Müll. Hal.
- Hypopterygium tamariscinum (Hedw.) Brid.
- Hypopterygium thouinii (Schwägr.) Mont.
- Hypopterygium tomentosum (Hedw.) Müll. Hal.
- Hypopterygium viridulum Mitt.
- Hypopterygium vriesei Bosch & Sande Lac.
