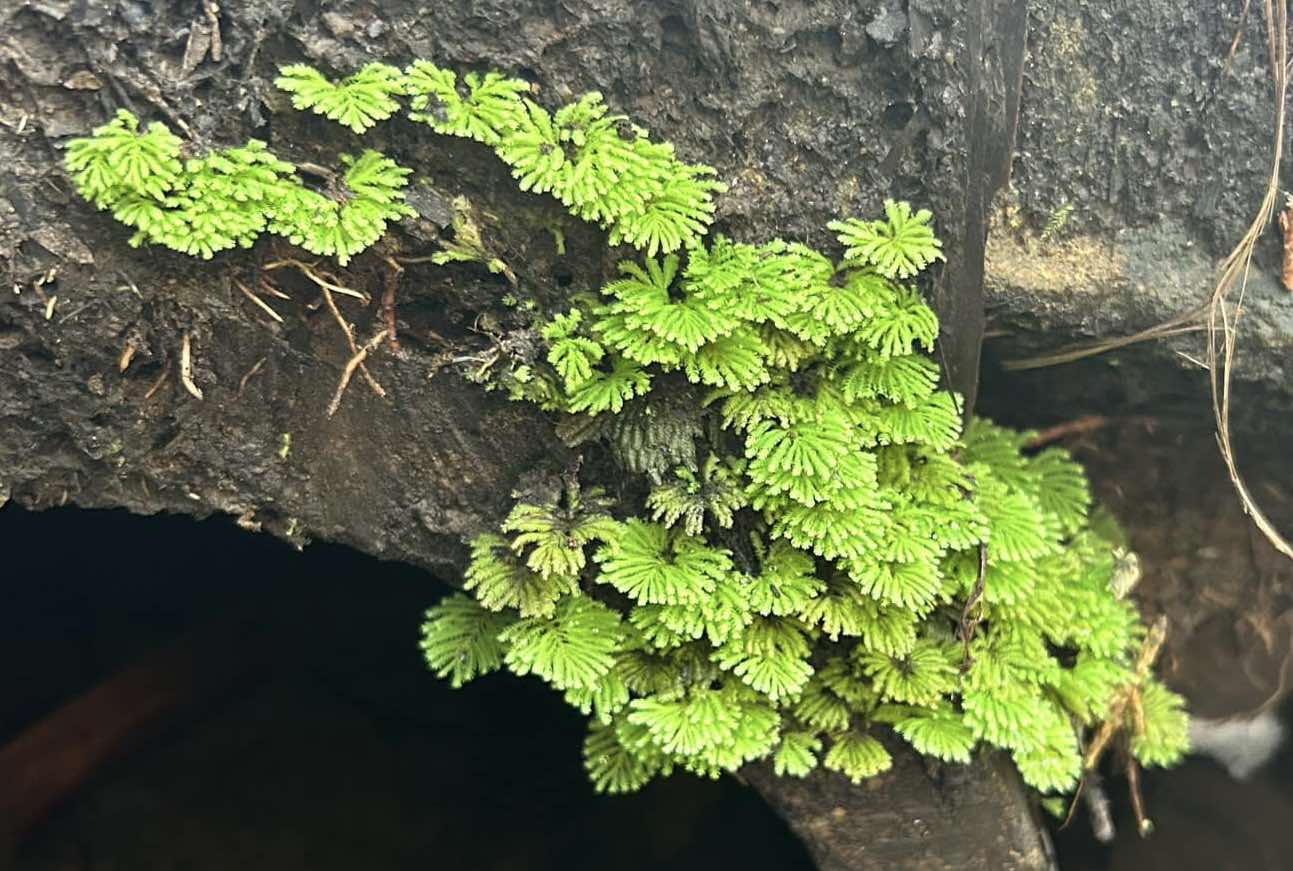

Scientific classification
- Kingdom: Plantae
- Division: Bryophyta
- Class: Bryopsida
- Subclass: Bryidae
- Order: Hypopterygiales
- Family: Hypopterygiaceae
- Genus: Hypopterygium
- Species: H. didictyon

Binomial name
- Hypopterygium didictyon Müll.Hal.
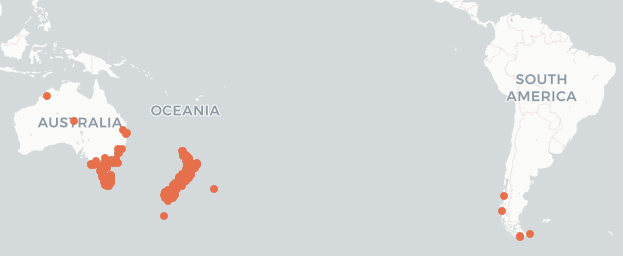
- Distribution of Hypopterygium didictyon

= Hypopterygium didictyon =

Species of plant

Hypopterygium didictyon, commonly known as umbrella moss, is a species of moss in the family Hypopterygiaceae. It is typically found in rainforests and wet forests, growing on tree trunks, rocks, and decaying logs in areas with sufficient moisture. This species is widespread in Tasmania, New South Wales, Victoria, but is less common in South Australia. It is also found in New Zealand and parts of South America.

== Description ==
Hypopterygium didictyon is a species of moss that typically forms dense clumps. The fronds have a glaucous (whitish-greenish) appearance, and the leaves are arranged in three distinct ranks: two lateral rows on the branches and one smaller row of underleaves beneath. The basal part of the frond has leaves arranged in eight ranks, and the upper part has leaves arranged in three ranks. These leaves are oblong to oval in shape, typically 0.5-2.0 mm long and 0.2-1.5 mm wide, with smooth or serrated margins.

The genus name Hypopterygium derives from the Greek words "hypo" (under) and "pteryga" (wing), referring to the wing-like structures found on the underside of the branches, known as amphigastria.

H. didictyon is strictly dioicous, meaning it has separate male and female plants that are required for sexual reproduction. In addition to sexual reproduction through spores, H. didictyon can also spread locally via vegetative fragments and gemmae (small, asexual reproductive bodies).

== Distribution ==
Hypopterygium didictyon grows in humid environments, often found on soil, rocks, rotting logs, and tree trunks in forests and scrubby woodlands, particularly near streams.

The species is found in New South Wales, Victoria, and Tasmania, and is rarely found in South Australia. It typically grows at elevations up to 1660 m. H. didictyon is also present in New Zealand, the Auckland Islands, Campbell Island, Chatham Island, and parts of southern South America.

Its distribution suggests a Gondwanan origin, with populations once connected before the break-up of the Palaeo-Austral floristic region around 82 million years ago, leading to its current isolated range.

While the possibility of long-range dispersal by spores via westerly winds is considered, it is unlikely due to the species' dioicous nature (having separate male and female plants) and a lack of specialised asexual reproduction mechanisms. The current distribution strongly supports a Gondwanan origin rather than long-distance dispersal.

== Identification ==
Hypopterygium didictyon is a common moss in Tasmania, characterised by its glaucous (whitish-greenish) appearance and distinct leaf arrangement. It is sometimes confused with H. tamarisci, a rarer species found mainly in northern Tasmania. While the two species share similarities, H. tamarisci is distinguished from H. didictyon primarily by microscopic features.

The fronds of H. didictyon have eight ranks of leaves at the basal part, transitioning to three ranks at the distal (upper) part of the frond. These leaves are typically oblong to oval in shape, ranging in size from 0.5 to 2.0 mm in length and 0.2 to 1.5 mm in width. Microscopically, H. didictyon can be distinguished by its axillary hairs, which have terminal cells that are linear or short-linear, often covered with a white substance, visible under a hand lens as white dots.

In comparison, H. tamarisci has axillary hairs with terminal cells that are bulb-like and the basal frond leaves are arranged in three ranks.
