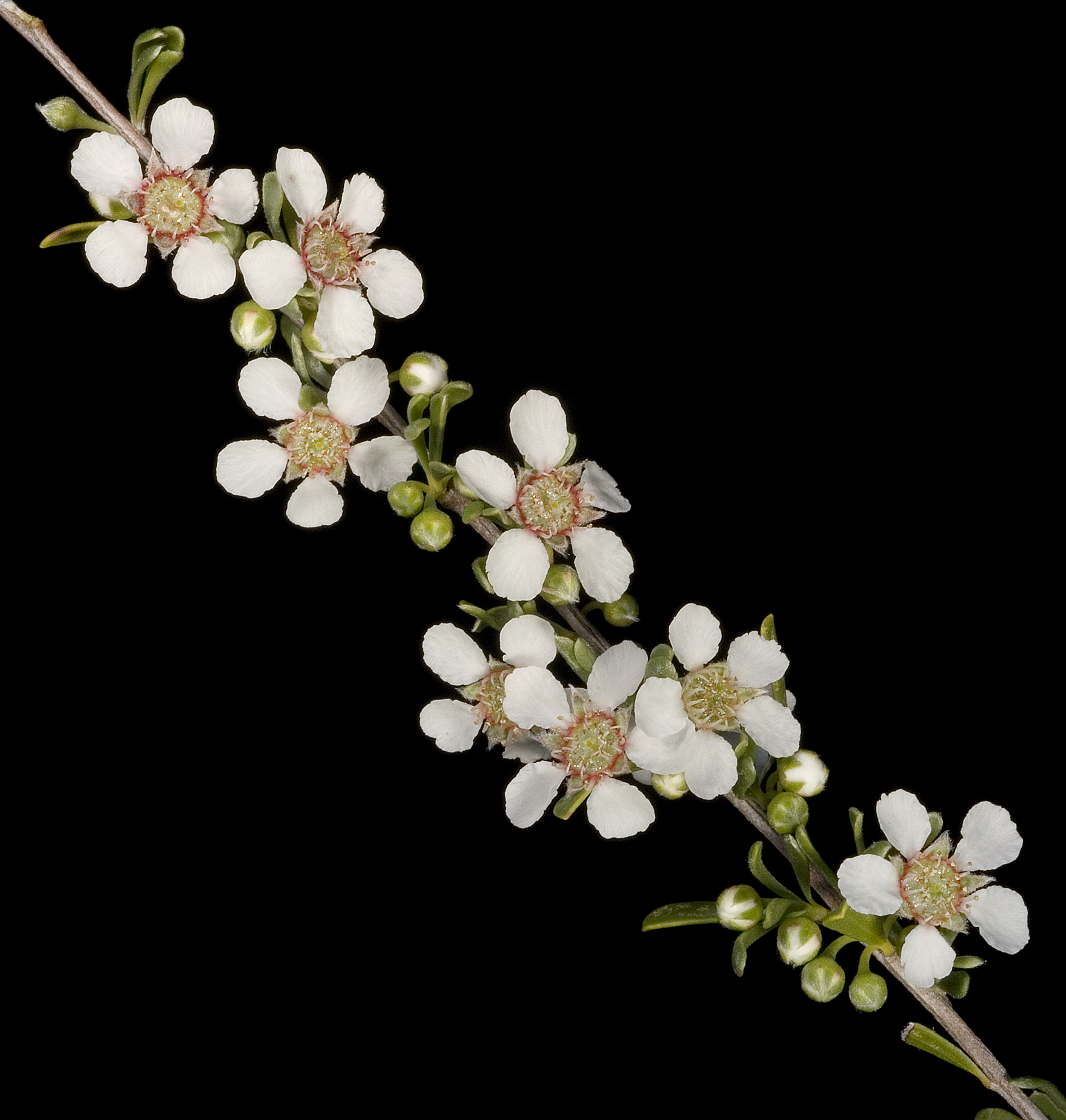

Scientific classification
- Kingdom: Plantae
- Clade: Tracheophytes
- Clade: Angiosperms
- Clade: Eudicots
- Clade: Rosids
- Order: Myrtales
- Family: Myrtaceae
- Genus: Leptospermopsis
- Species: L. fastigiata

Binomial name
- Leptospermopsis fastigiata (S.Moore) Peter G.Wilson
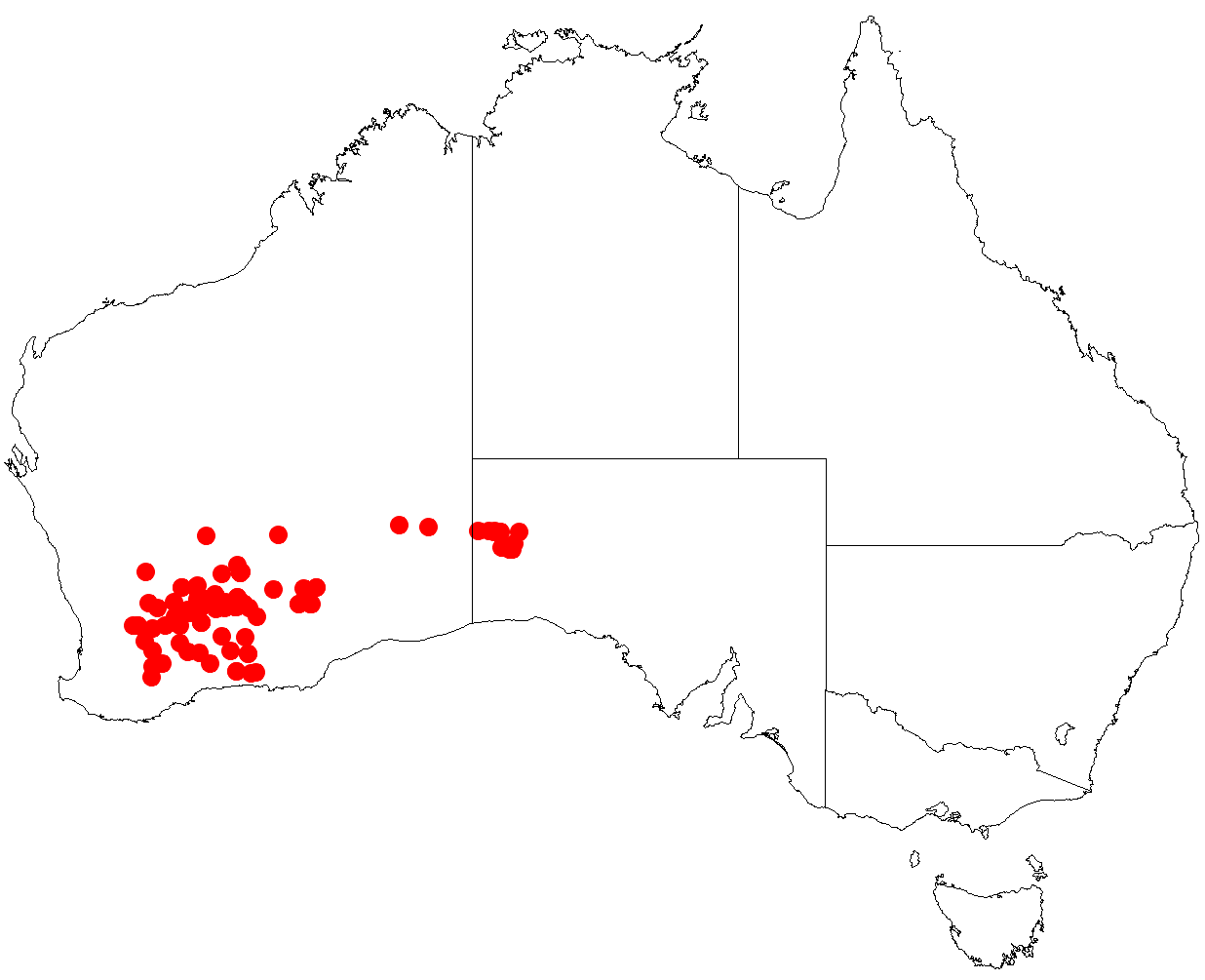
- Occurrence data from AVH

Synonyms
- Leptospermum fastigiatum S.Moore

= Leptospermopsis fastigiata =

Species of plant

Leptospermopsis fastigiatum is a shrub that is endemic to the south-west of Australia. It has narrow egg-shaped leaves with the narrower end towards the base and a small point on the tip, white flowers arranged singly or in pairs on short side shoots and small fruit that fall off when mature.

== Description ==
Leptospermopsis fastigiatum is a shrub that typically grows to a height of 1–3 m (3 ft 3 in – 9 ft 10 in) and has thin rough bark on the older branches, and young stems that are silky at first, later glabrous. The leaves are narrowly egg-shaped with the narrower end towards the base, 5–12 mm (0.20–0.47 in) long and 1–4 mm (0.039–0.157 in) wide tapering to a short petiole and with a small point on the tip. The flowers are arranged singly or in pairs on short side branches and are 6–10 mm (0.24–0.39 in) in diameter. There are a few broad, reddish brown bracts at the base of the flower bud that usually fall off as the flower opens. The floral cup is sessile, silky hairy and 3–4 mm (0.12–0.16 in) long. The sepals are triangular, about 1.5 mm (0.059 in) long, the petals about 3 mm (0.12 in) long and the stamens about 1 mm (0.039 in) long. Flowering occurs from September to December and the fruit is a capsule about 3 mm (0.12 in) wide and silky hairy with the remains of the sepals attached, but which falls off soon after releasing the seeds.

== Taxonomy and naming ==
This species was first formally described in 1920 by the botanist Spencer Moore who gave it the name Leptospermum fastigiatum in the Journal of the Linnean Society, Botany. In 2023, Peter Gordon Wilson transferred the species to the genus Leptospermopsis as L. trinervium in the journal Taxon. The specific epithet (fastigiatum) is a Latin word meaning "fastigiate", (erect and parallel).

== Distribution and habitat ==
This tea-tree is found on sand plains and among rocky outcrops in the Wheatbelt and Goldfields-Esperance regions of Western Australia extending into the Great Victoria Desert in western South Australia, growing in sandy soils.

== Uses ==
This plant contains essential oils, including 82.8% α-pinene.
