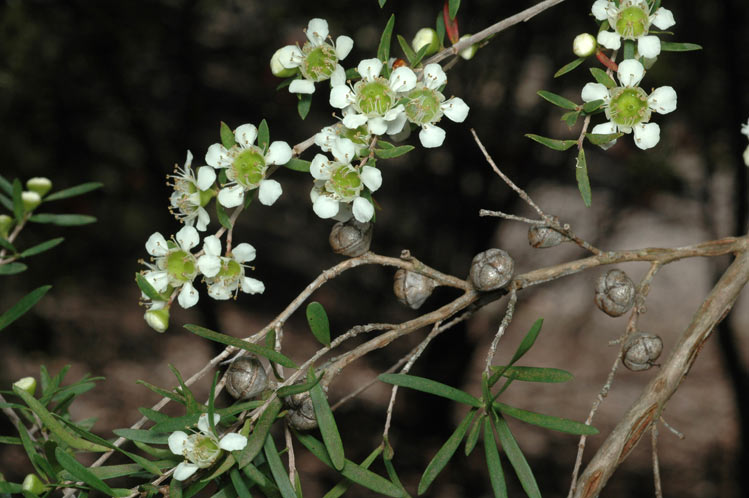
- In the Australian National Botanic Gardens

Scientific classification
- Kingdom: Plantae
- Clade: Tracheophytes
- Clade: Angiosperms
- Clade: Eudicots
- Clade: Rosids
- Order: Myrtales
- Family: Myrtaceae
- Genus: Leptospermopsis
- Species: L. incana

Binomial name
- Leptospermopsis incana (Turcz.) Peter G.Wilson
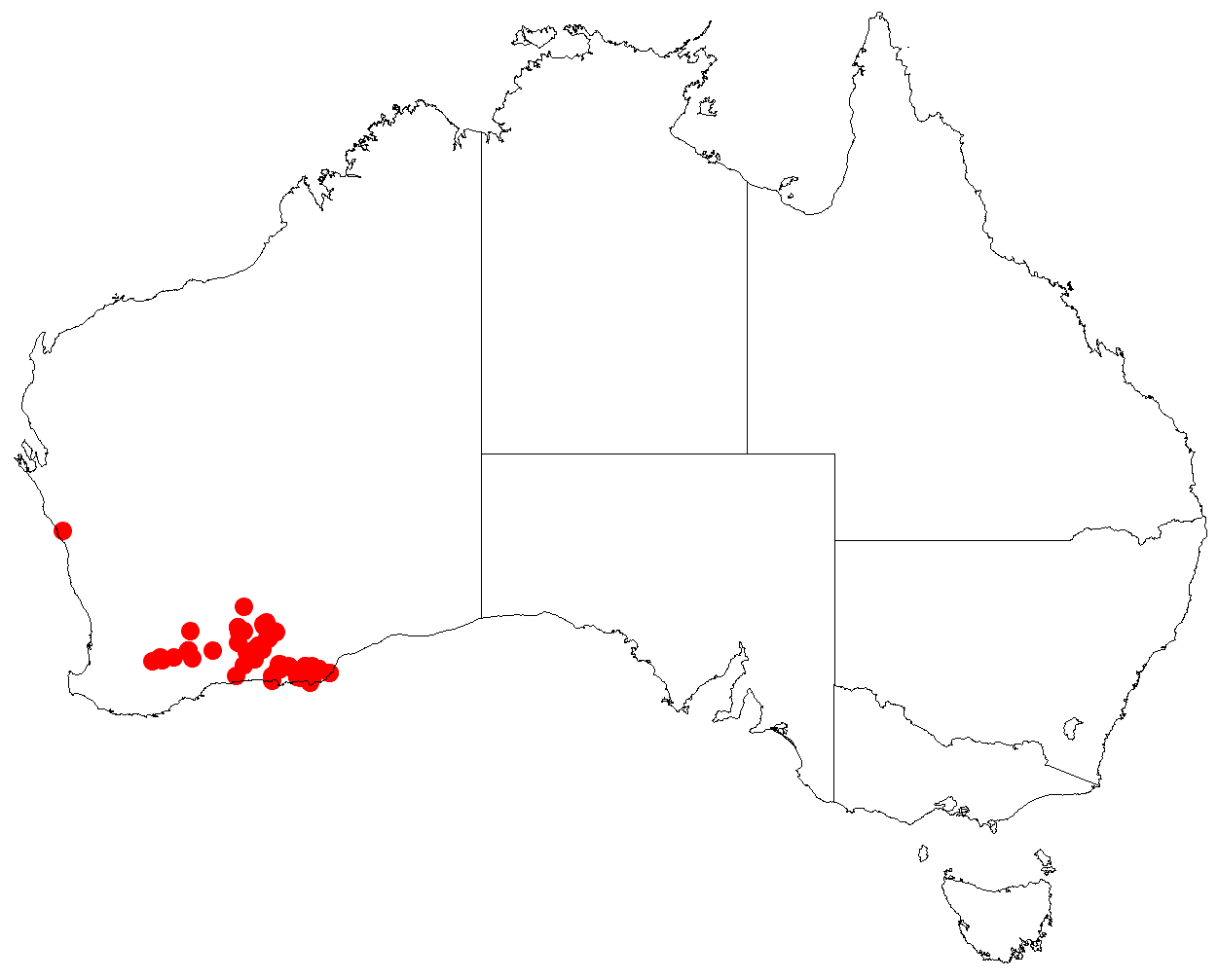
- Occurrence data from AVH

= Leptospermopsis incana =

Species of shrub

Leptospermopsis incana is a species of compact shrub that is endemic to Western Australia. It has hairy young stems, elongated egg-shaped leaves on a short petiole, relatively large white or pink flowers and fruit that fall from the plant when mature.

== Description ==
Leptospermopsis incana is a compact shrub that typically grows to a height of 1–3 m (3 ft 3 in – 9 ft 10 in) with peeling bark on the older branches and younger stems with soft, fine hairs pressed against the surface. The leaves are an elongated egg shape, mostly about 15 mm (0.59 in) long and 2–5 mm (0.079–0.197 in) wide. The flowers are white or pink, 10–15 mm (0.39–0.59 in) wide and are borne singly or in pairs on short side shoots. The floral cup is about 3 mm (0.12 in) long and is covered with flattened silky hairs on a pedicel 3–5 mm (0.12–0.20 in) long. The sepals are triangular, about 1–2 mm (0.039–0.079 in) long, the petals about 5 mm (0.20 in) long and the stamens 1.5–2.5 mm (0.059–0.098 in) long. Flowering occurs from July to December and the fruit is a capsule 3–3.5 mm (0.12–0.14 in) long with the remains of the sepals attached, but that falls from the plant after the release of the seeds.

== Taxonomy and naming ==
This species was first formally described in 1852 by Nikolai Turczaninow who gave it the name Leptospermum incanum in the Bulletin de la Classe Physico-Mathématique de l'Académie Impériale des Sciences de Saint-Pétersbourg from material collected by James Drummond. In 2023, Peter Gordon Wilson transferred the species to the genus Leptospermopsis as L. incana in the journal Taxon. The specific epithet (incana) is a Latin word meaning hoary.

== Distribution and habitat ==
This tea-tree is found among granite outcrops between Coolgardie and the south coast of Western Australia where it grows in sandy soils in the Avon Wheatbelt, Coolgardie, Esperance Plains and Mallee biogeographic regions.

== Conservation status ==
Leptospermopsis incana is classified as "not threatened" by the Western Australian Government Department of Parks and Wildlife.
