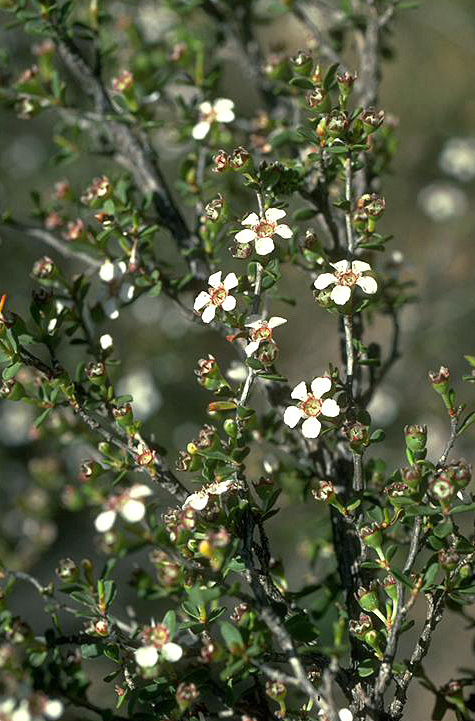
- Near Ravensthorpe

Scientific classification
- Kingdom: Plantae
- Clade: Tracheophytes
- Clade: Angiosperms
- Clade: Eudicots
- Clade: Rosids
- Order: Myrtales
- Family: Myrtaceae
- Genus: Leptospermopsis
- Species: L. maxwellii

Binomial name
- Leptospermopsis maxwellii (S.Moore) Peter G.Wilson

Synonyms
- Leptospermum maxwellii S.Moore

= Leptospermopsis maxwellii =

Species of shrub

Leptospermopsis maxwellii is a species of often low-growing shrub that is endemic to Western Australia. It has thin, flaking bark, egg-shaped leaves, white flowers arranged singly on short side shoots and fruit with the remains of the sepals attached.

== Description ==
Leptospermopsis maxwellii is a shrub that typically grows to a height of 0.5–2.3 m (1 ft 8 in – 7 ft 7 in) and has thin, flaking bark. The leaves are egg-shaped, narrower towards the base, up to 12 mm (0.47 in) long and 1–5 mm (0.039–0.197 in) wide on a short petiole. The flowers are white and are usually borne in pairs on short side shoots. There are reddish brown bracts and bracteoles at the base of the buds but that are shed early in the flower's development. The floral cup is 2–3 mm (0.079–0.118 in) long and marked with vertical ridges. The sepals are 1–2 mm (0.039–0.079 in) long and triangular and the petals 2.5–5 mm (0.098–0.197 in) long. Flowering mainly occurs from September to November and the fruit is up to 5 mm (0.20 in) in diameter and wrinkled with the remnants of the sepals attached.

== Taxonomy and naming ==
This species was first formally described in 1920 by Spencer Le Marchant Moore who gave it the name Leptospermum maxwell, and the description was published in The Journal of the Linnean Society, Botany from specimens collected by George Maxwell near the Fitzgerald River. In 2023, Peter Gordon Wilson transferred the species to the genus Leptospermopsis as L. maxwellii in the journal Taxon. The specific epithet (maxwellii) honours the collector of the type specimens.

== Distribution and habitat ==
This tea tree grows on stony ridges in sandy soils over granite or laterite, in the Esperance Plains and Mallee biogeographic regions.
