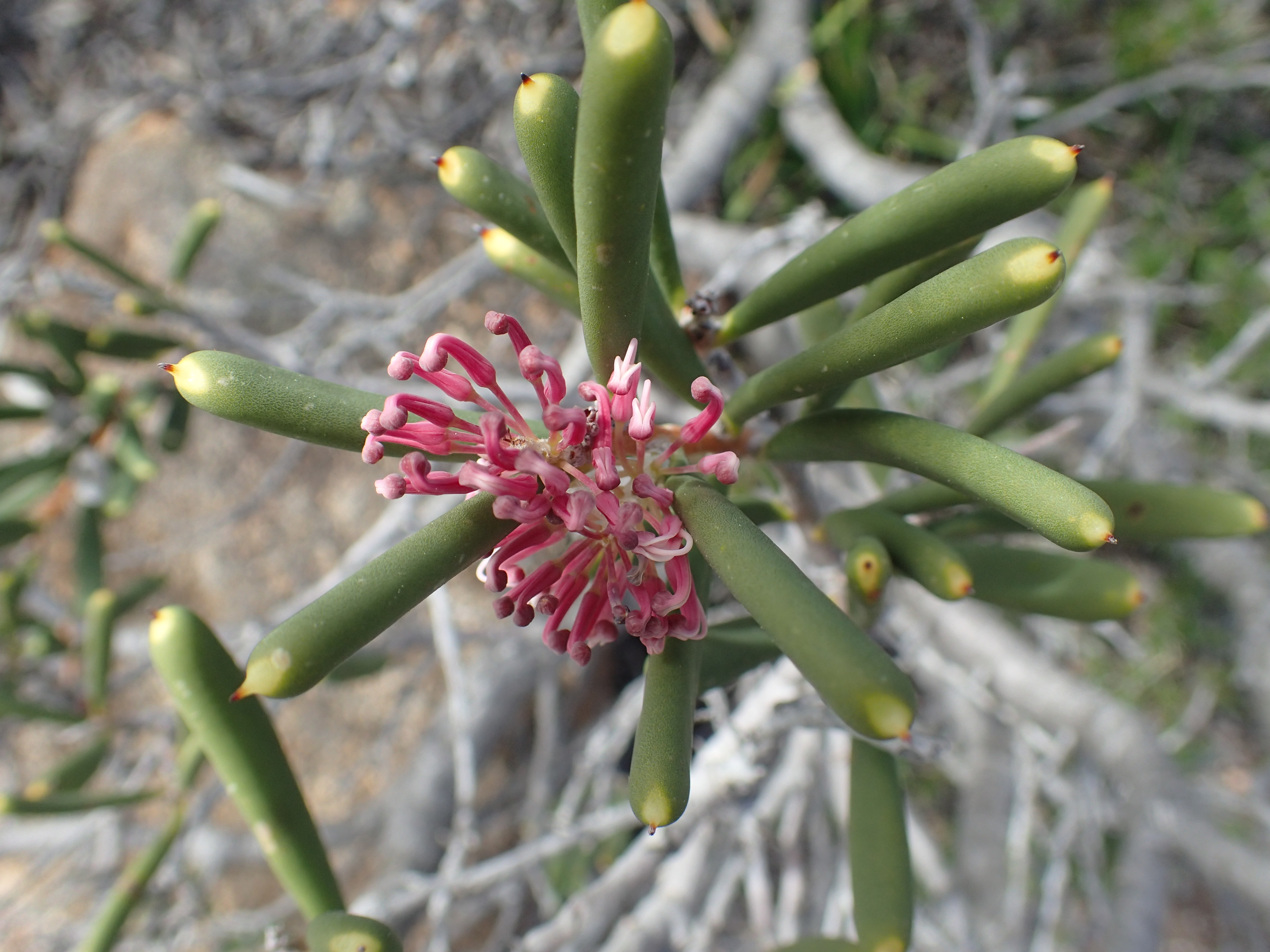
- In the Cape Le Grand National Park

Scientific classification
- Kingdom: Plantae
- Clade: Tracheophytes
- Clade: Angiosperms
- Clade: Eudicots
- Order: Proteales
- Family: Proteaceae
- Genus: Hakea
- Species: H. clavata

Binomial name
- Hakea clavata Labill.
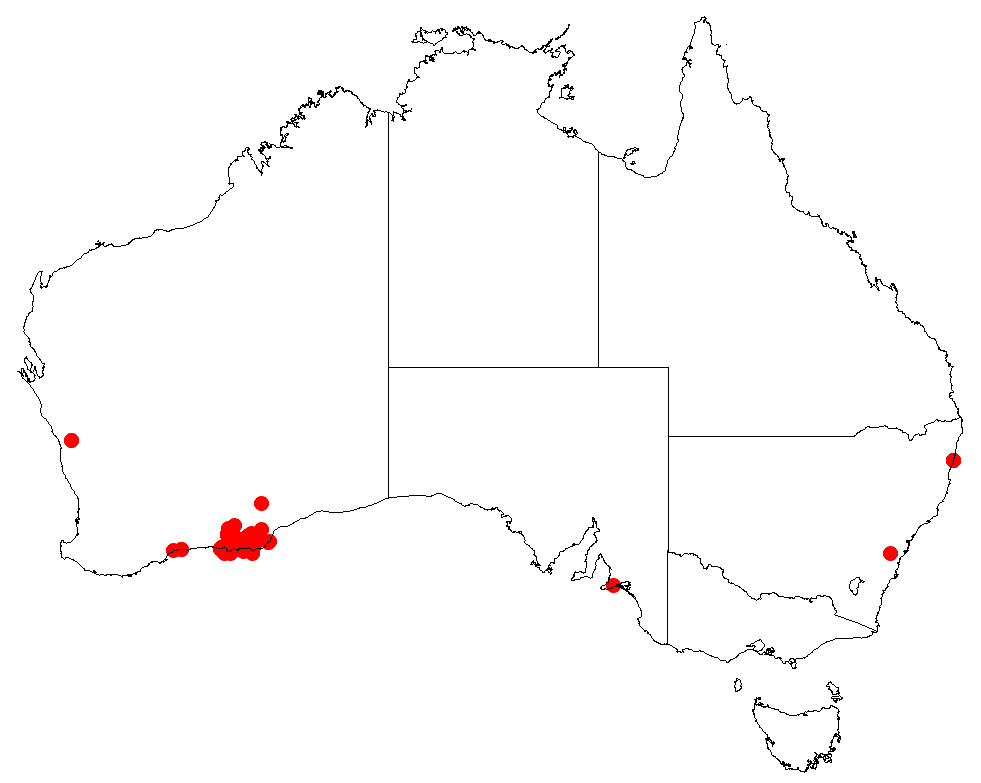
- Occurrence data from AVH

= Hakea clavata =

Coastal hakea

Species of shrub endemic to Western Australia

Hakea clavata, commonly known as coastal hakea is a shrub that is endemic to an area along the south coast of Western Australia. It has thick leaves, pink and grey flowers and grows on rocky outcrops.

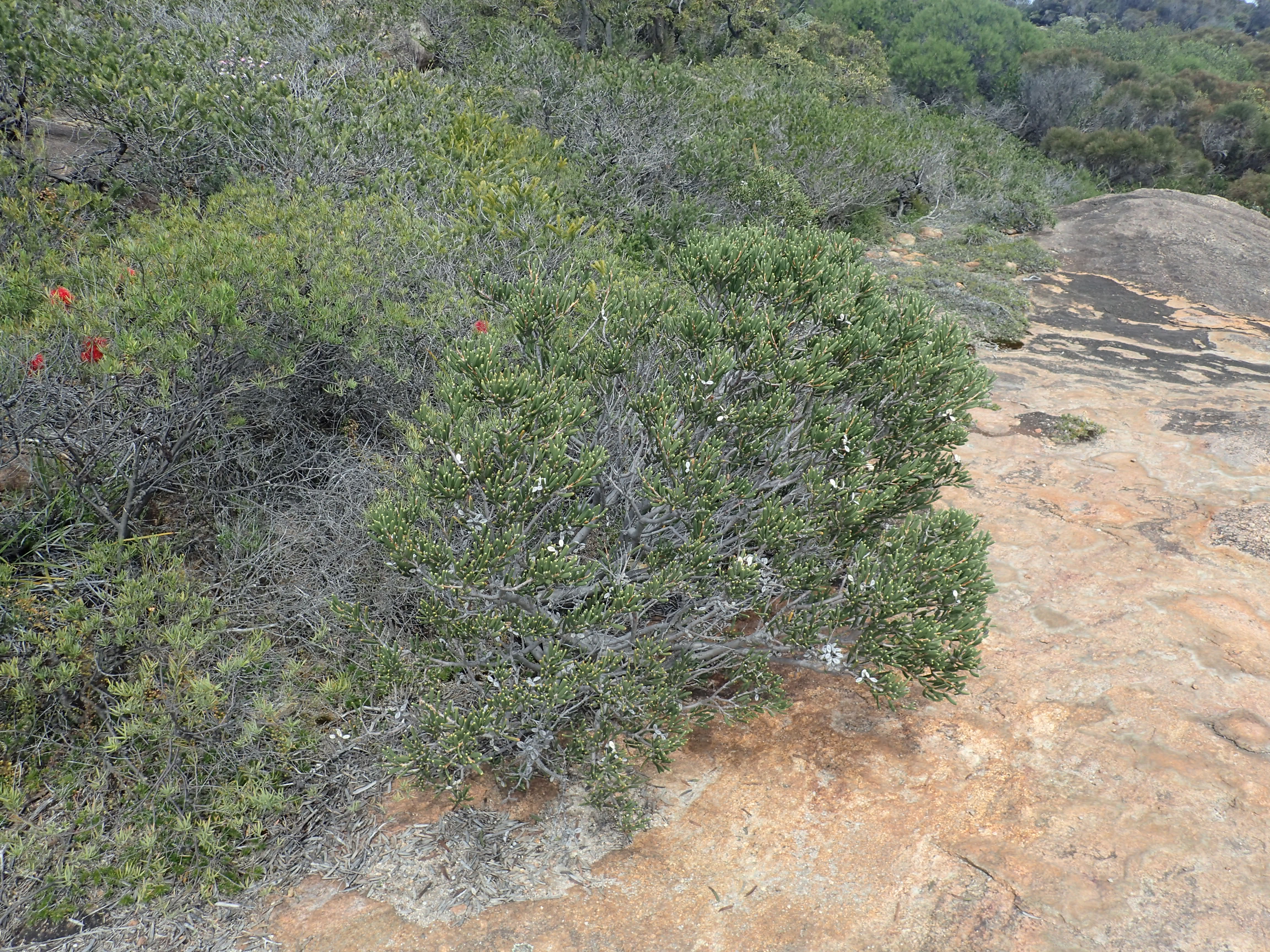
On a rocky granite outcrop at Lucky Bay

== Description ==
Hakea clavata is a lignotuberous spreading or sprawling shrub up to 2.5 metres (8 ft) wide and 0.5 to 2.0 m (1.6 to 6.6 ft) high. Mid-green leaves are thick, flattened, long and narrow 2 to 8 centimetres (0.8 to 3.1 in) long and 4 to 11 millimetres (0.157 to 0.433 in) wide, ending in a hard sharp point. Sometimes club-shaped widening at the apex. The inflorescence has 60–80 white and pink flowers appearing in short racemes in leaf axils and tips of branches. The perianth has a pink claw, grey limbs and white interior. Woody fruit are egg-shaped with the widest part nearer the stem 1.5 to 2.5 cm (0.59 to 0.98 in) long and 0.9 to 1.0 cm (0.35 to 0.39 in) wide. Alternatively egg-shaped with the wider section toward the apex, both shapes having two small horns at the back of the fruit. The black-brown seeds have an obliquely obovate shape and a length of 16 mm (0.630 in). Each seed has a broad wing along one side of seed body.

== Taxonomy ==
Hakea clavata was first formally described in 1805 by Jacques Labillardière in Novae Hollandiae plantarum specimen. Labillardière may have made a type collection when at the Esperance region in December 1792. The specific epithet (clavata) is derived from the Latin word clava meaning "club", referring to the club-shape of the leaves.

== Distribution ==
Coastal hakea is found on the mainland and on some of the islands between Israelite Bay and Esperance and a single population is known at Hopetoun to the west. The range covers southeastern areas of the Southwest Botanical Province. The species grows in rocky sandy clay soils among granite outcrops and withstands salt laden winds.
