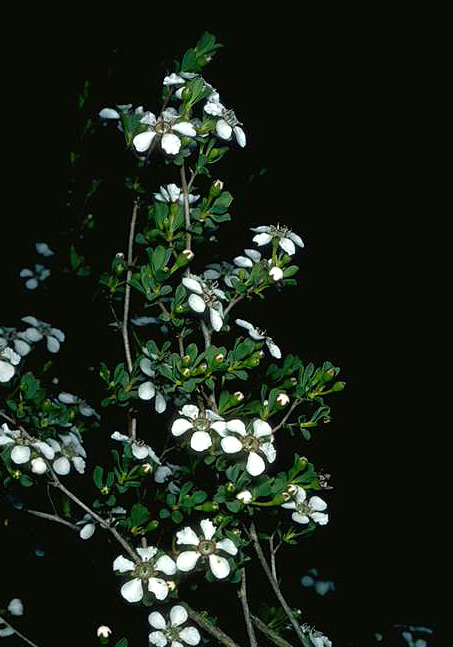
- Near Ravensthorpe

Scientific classification
- Kingdom: Plantae
- Clade: Tracheophytes
- Clade: Angiosperms
- Clade: Eudicots
- Clade: Rosids
- Order: Myrtales
- Family: Myrtaceae
- Genus: Leptospermopsis
- Species: L. nitens

Binomial name
- Leptospermopsis nitens (Turcz.) Peter G.Wilson

Synonyms
- Leptospermum nitens Turcz.

= Leptospermopsis nitens =

Species of shrub

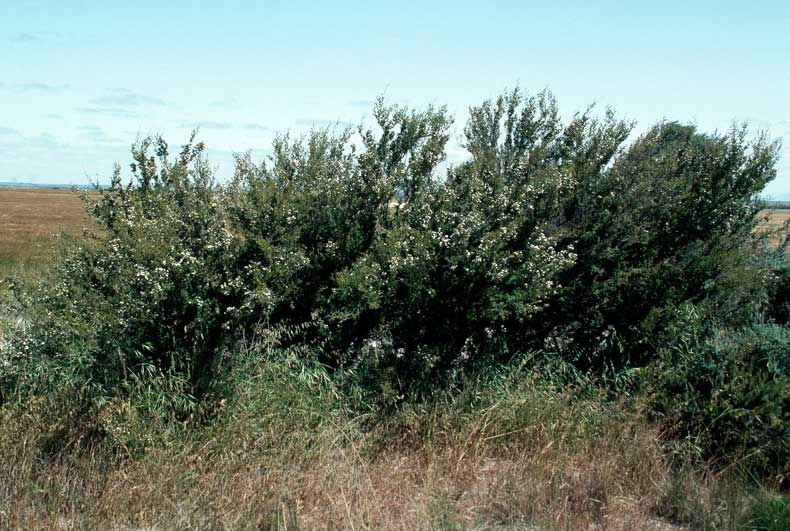
Habit near Borden

Leptospermopsis nitens is a species of slender shrub that is endemic to Western Australia. It has thin, fibrous bark, narrow egg-shaped to wedge-shaped leaves, white or pink flowers on short side branches and fruit with the sepals attached but that falls from the plant shortly after the seeds reach maturity.

== Description ==
Leptospermopsis nitens is a slender shrub that typically grows to a height of about 3 m (9.8 ft) with thin, fibrous bark on the older branches and younger stems with soft, silky hairs at first. The leaves are narrow egg-shaped to narrow wedge-shaped, 5–12 mm (0.20–0.47 in) long and 1.5–3.5 mm (0.059–0.138 in) wide on a short petiole. The flowers are white or pink, about 7–12 mm (0.28–0.47 in) wide and are borne singly or in pairs on short side shoots. The floral cup is about 2–3 mm (0.079–0.118 in) long and is covered with flattened silky hairs, on a pedicel about 2 mm (0.079 in) long. The sepals are triangular, about 1.5–2 mm (0.059–0.079 in) long and covered with flattened hairs like those on the floral cup. The petals are about 3–5 mm (0.12–0.20 in) long and the stamens about 2 mm (0.079 in) long. Flowering occurs from July to October, or in December or January and the fruit is a capsule 2.5–4 mm (0.098–0.157 in) long with the remains of the sepals attached, but that falls from the plant when the seeds mature.

== Taxonomy and naming ==
This species was first formally described in 1852 by Nikolai Turczaninow who gave it the name Leptospermum nitens in the Bulletin de la Classe Physico-Mathématique de l'Académie Impériale des Sciences de Saint-Pétersbourg from material collected by James Drummond. In 2023, Peter Gordon Wilson transferred the species to the genus Leptospermopsis as L. nitens in the journal Taxon. The specific epithet (nitens) is a Latin word meaning "bright" or "gleaming".

== Distribution and habitat ==
This tea-tree is often found on hills and among granite or sandstone rocks in parts of the Avon Wheatbelt, Coolgardie, Esperance Plains, Mallee and Murchison biogeographic regions.
