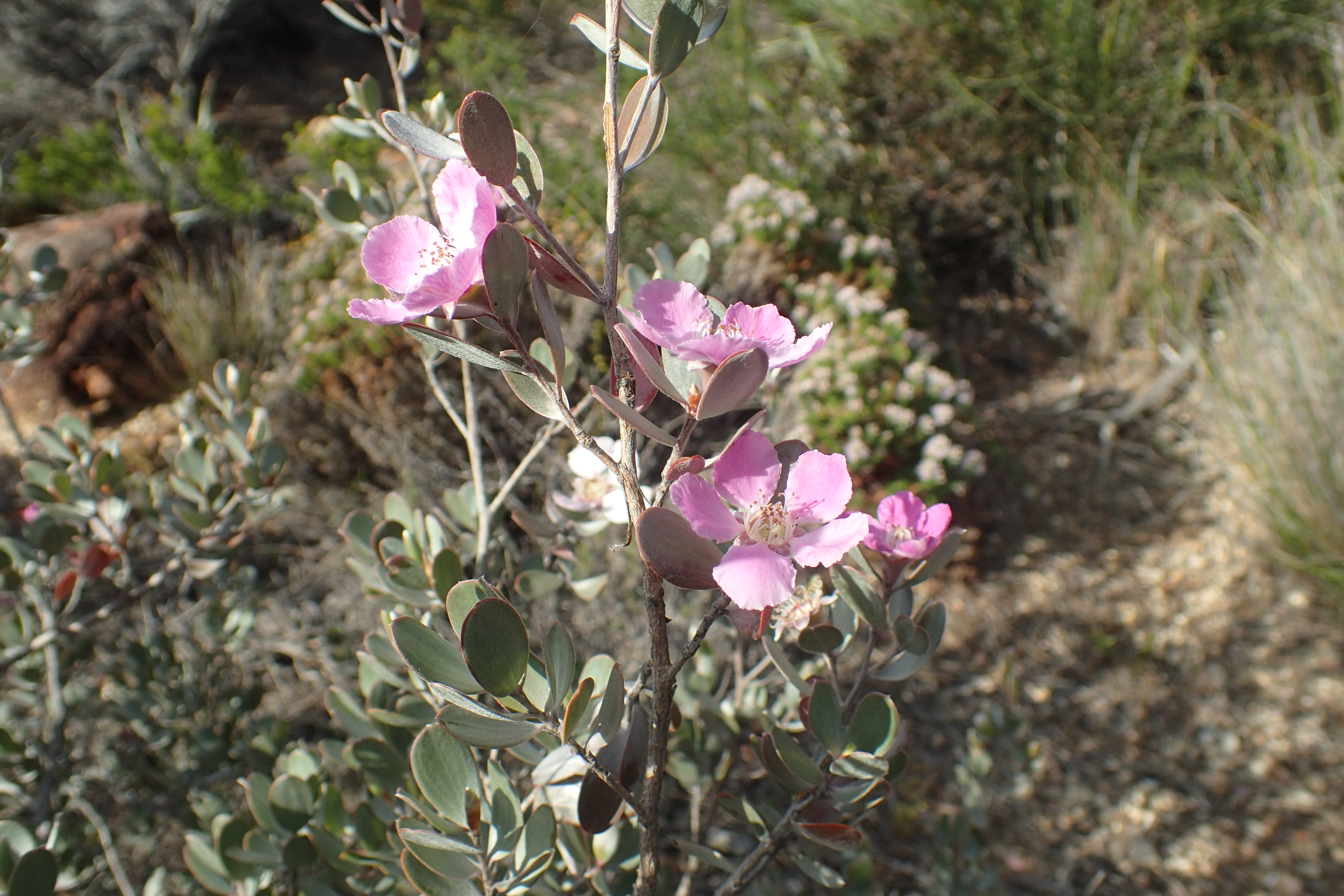

Scientific classification
- Kingdom: Plantae
- Clade: Tracheophytes
- Clade: Angiosperms
- Clade: Eudicots
- Clade: Rosids
- Order: Myrtales
- Family: Myrtaceae
- Genus: Leptospermopsis
- Species: L. sericea

Binomial name
- Leptospermopsis sericea (Labill.) Peter G.Wilson

Synonyms
- Leptospermum sericeum Labill.

= Leptospermopsis sericea =

Silver teatree

Species of shrub

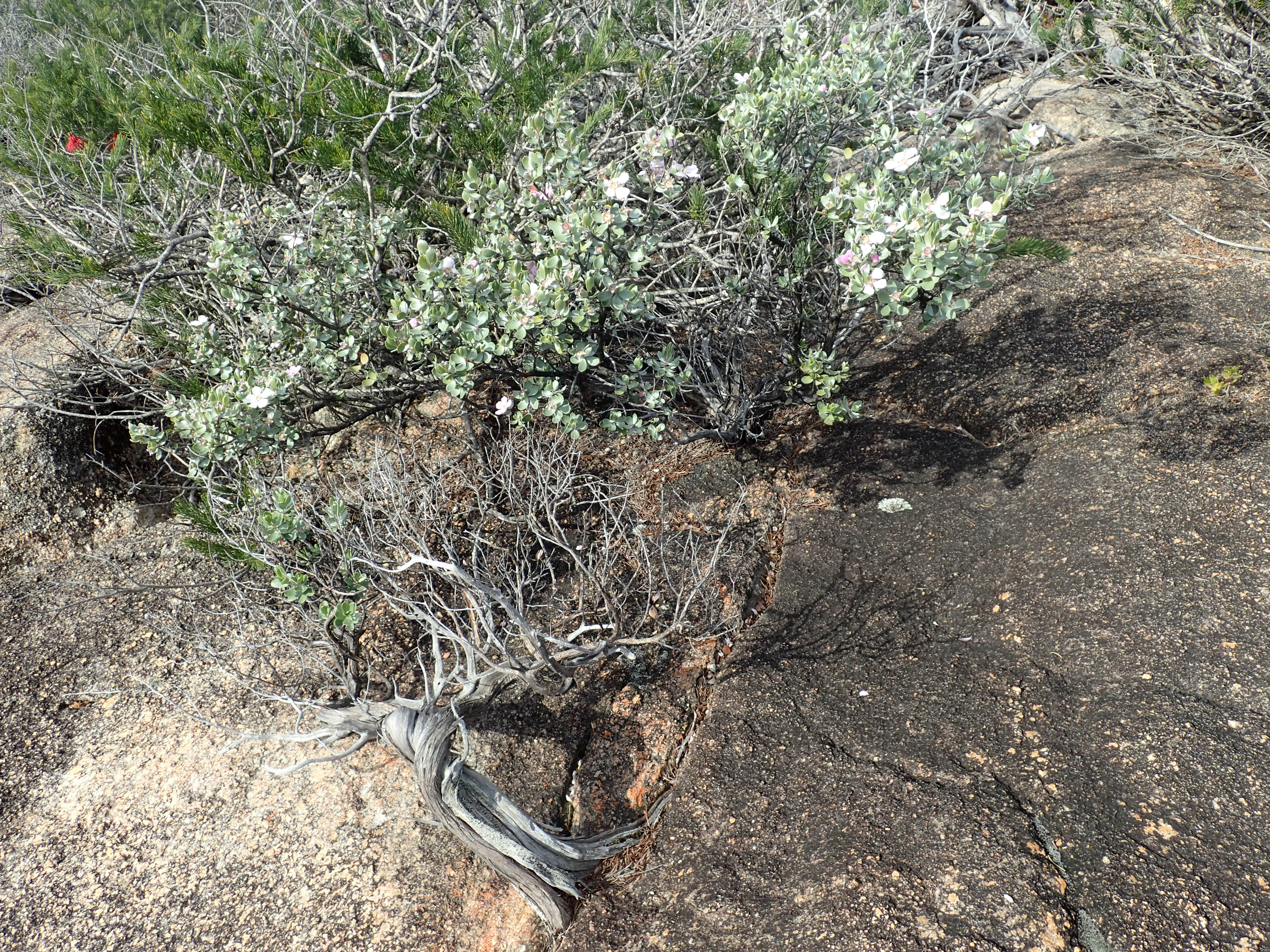
Habit on the headland at Lucky Bay

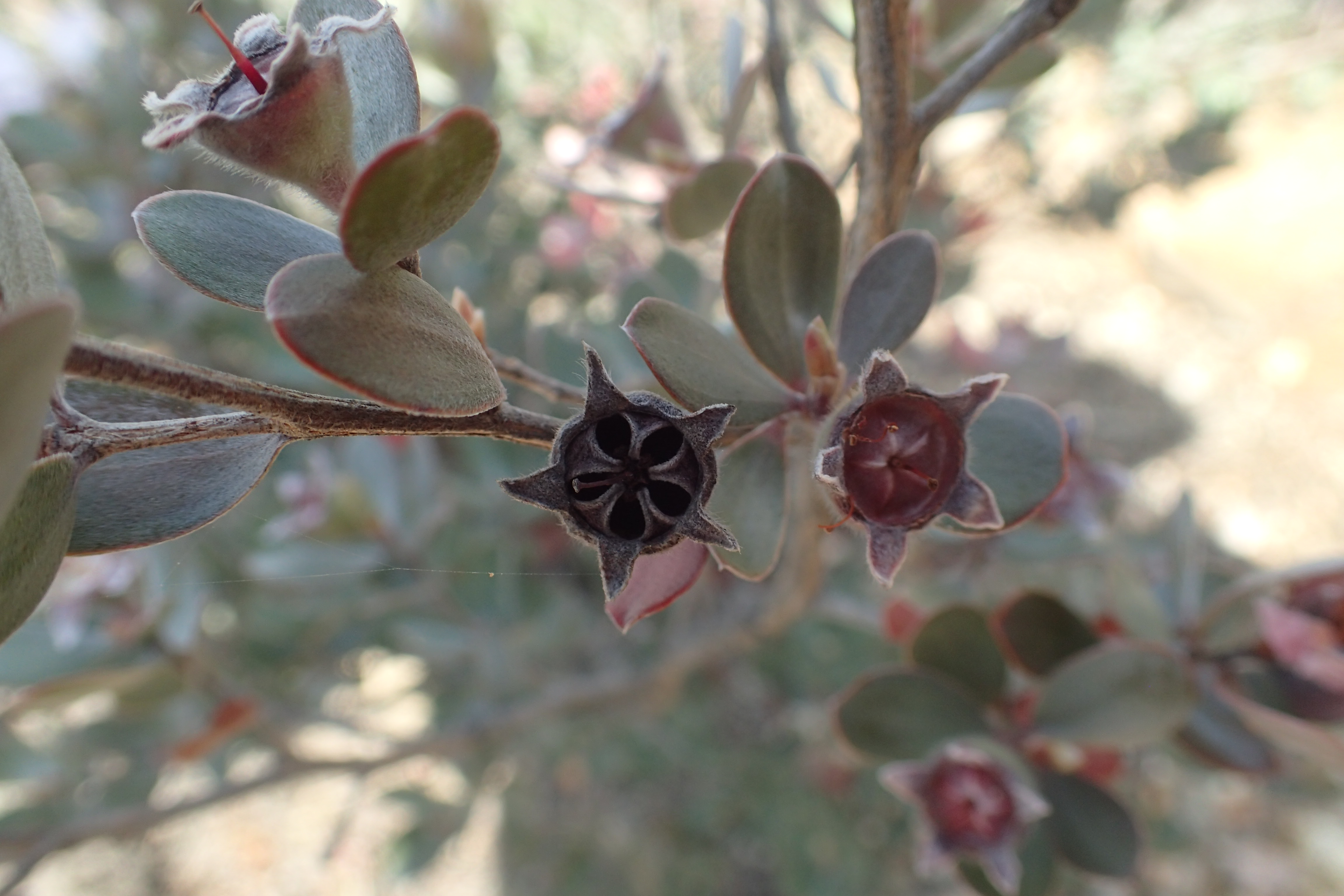
Fruit after seed release

Leptospermopsis sericea, commonly known as the silver tea tree, is a species of shrub that is endemic to the south-west of Western Australia. It has thin, firm bark, egg-shaped leaves with the narrower end towards the base, relatively large, pink flowers and fruit that fall from the plant with the seeds. It grows in windswept rock crevices near Esperance.

== Description ==
Leptospermopsis sericea is a shrub that typically grows to a height of 1–3 m (3 ft 3 in – 9 ft 10 in) and has thin, firm bark. The leaves are egg-shaped with the narrower end towards the base, mostly 10–20 mm (0.39–0.79 in) long and 5–10 mm (0.20–0.39 in) wide, tapering to a short, broad petiole. The leaves are covered with a layer of silvery grey hairs, at least at first, sometimes becoming glabrous later. The flowers are pink, 15–25 mm (0.59–0.98 in) wide and are arranged singly or in pairs on short side shoots. The flower buds have reddish brown bracts and bracteoles at the base but that fall off well before the flower opens. The floral cup is 4–6 mm (0.16–0.24 in) long on a short pedicel and is densely covered with soft hairs. The sepals are 2–3 mm (0.079–0.118 in) long and are not differentiated from the floral cup. The petals are 6–12 mm (0.24–0.47 in) long and the stamens 3.5–4 mm (0.14–0.16 in) long. Flowering mainly occurs from August to September and the fruit is a capsule about 7 mm (0.28 in) long on a pedicel usually 2–3 mm (0.079–0.118 in) long. The remnants of the sepals remain attached to the fruit, but the fruit falls from the plant when the seeds mature.

== Taxonomy and naming ==
This species was first described in 1806 by Jacques Labillardière who gave it the name Leptospermum sericeum and published the description in Novae Hollandiae Plantarum Specimen. In 2023, Peter Gordon Wilson transferred the species to the genus Leptospermopsis as L. sericea in the journal Taxon.

Labillardière mistakenly gave the type location as "Capite van Diemen" (Tasmania). George Bentham considered the species a synonym of Kunzea sericea Turcz. in Flora Australiensis, as did Joy Thompson in her 1990 paper in the journal Telopea. The Australian Plant Census considers that Charles Gardner was correct in listing Kunzea sericea and L. sericea as separate species, the former occurring more than 160 km (99 mi) from the coast and L. sericea as being found on the islands of the Recherche Archipelago. (Kunzea sericea is now considered to be a synonym of Kunzea pulchella.)

== Distribution and habitat ==
Silver teatree grows in shallow soil in the crevices of windswept granite outcrops near Esperance, including on nearby islands.

== Conservation status ==
This leptospermum is listed as "not threatened" by the Western Australian Government Department of Parks and Wildlife.
