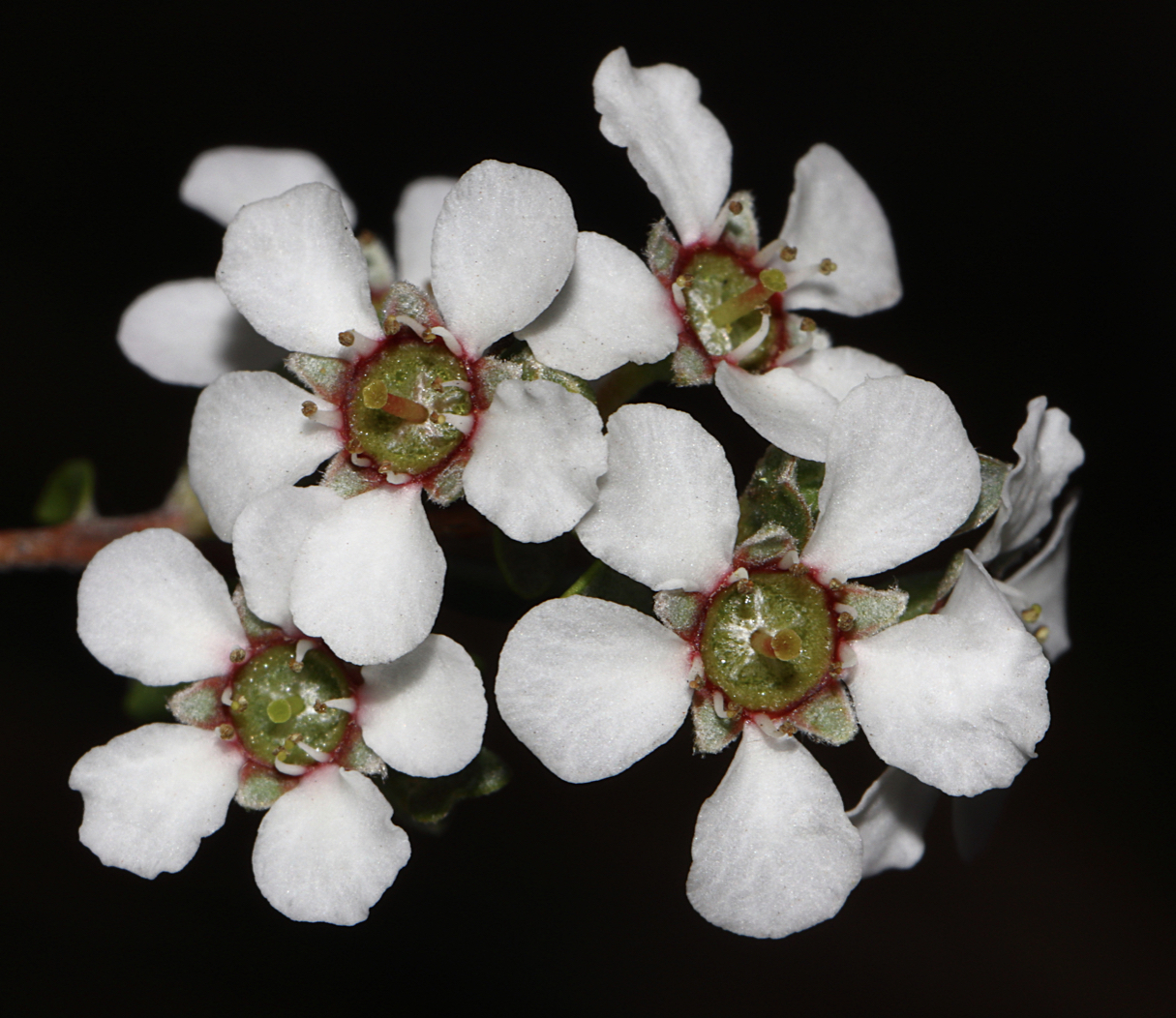
- Near Wandering

Scientific classification
- Kingdom: Plantae
- Clade: Tracheophytes
- Clade: Angiosperms
- Clade: Eudicots
- Clade: Rosids
- Order: Myrtales
- Family: Myrtaceae
- Genus: Leptospermopsis
- Species: L. oligandra

Binomial name
- Leptospermopsis oligandra (Turcz.) Peter G.Wilson

Synonyms
- Leptospermum oligandrum Turcz.; Kunzea podantha F.Muell.); Leptospermopsis myrtifolia S.Moore; Leptospermum erubescens var. psilocalyx Benth.; Leptospermum podanthum (F.Muell.) Diels

= Leptospermopsis oligandra =

Species of shrub

Leptospermopsis oligandra is a species of erect, spreading shrub that is endemic to the south-west of Western Australia. It has broadly egg-shaped to wedge-shaped leaves, white flowers arranged singly or in groups of up to three on the ends of short side branches and fruit that fall from the plant shortly after the seeds are released.

== Description ==
Leptospermopsis oligandra is an erect spreading shrub that grows to a height of 0.4–3 m (1 ft 4 in – 9 ft 10 in) and has thin stringy or flaky bark on the older stems. The young stems are silky-hairy at first, later glabrous. The leaves are broadly egg-shaped with the narrower end towards the base or wedge-shaped, 3–10 mm (0.12–0.39 in) long and 2–4 mm (0.079–0.157 in) wide tapering to a petiole less than 1 mm (0.039 in) long. The flowers are white, 3–10 mm (0.12–0.39 in) wide and arranged singly or in groups of up to three on short, leafy side shoots. The flower buds have egg-shaped, reddish brown bracts and bracteoles at the base but that usually fall off well before the flower opens. The floral cup is 2–3 mm (0.079–0.118 in) or more long on a thin pedicel 2–5 mm (0.079–0.197 in) long. The sepals are 1–1.5 mm (0.039–0.059 in) long and are not differentiated from the floral cup. The petals are 1.5–3 mm (0.059–0.118 in) long and the stamens about 1 mm (0.039 in) long. Flowering mainly occurs from September to December and the fruit is a capsule 2–4 mm (0.079–0.157 in) long with the remnants of the sepals attached but that falls from the plant when the seeds mature.

== Taxonomy and naming ==
This species was first formally described in 1852 by Nikolai Turczaninow who gave it the name Leptospermum oligandrum in the Bulletin de la Classe Physico-Mathématique de l'Académie Impériale des Sciences de Saint-Pétersbourg from material collected by James Drummond. In 2023, Peter Gordon Wilson transferred the species to the genus Leptospermopsis as L. trinervium in the journal Taxon. The specific epithet is derived from ancient Greek words oligos (ὀλίγος), meaning 'few' and anēr, genitive andros (ἀνήρ, genitive ἀνδρός), meaning 'male', referring to the few stamens in the flowers.

== Distribution and habitat ==
This tea-tree usually grows in heath or scrub and is widespread in the Avon Wheatbelt, Esperance Plains, Geraldton Sandplains, Jarrah Forest, Mallee and Swan Coastal Plain biogeographic regions of Western Australia.

== Conservation status ==
This species is classified as "not threatened" by the Western Australian Government Department of Parks and Wildlife.
