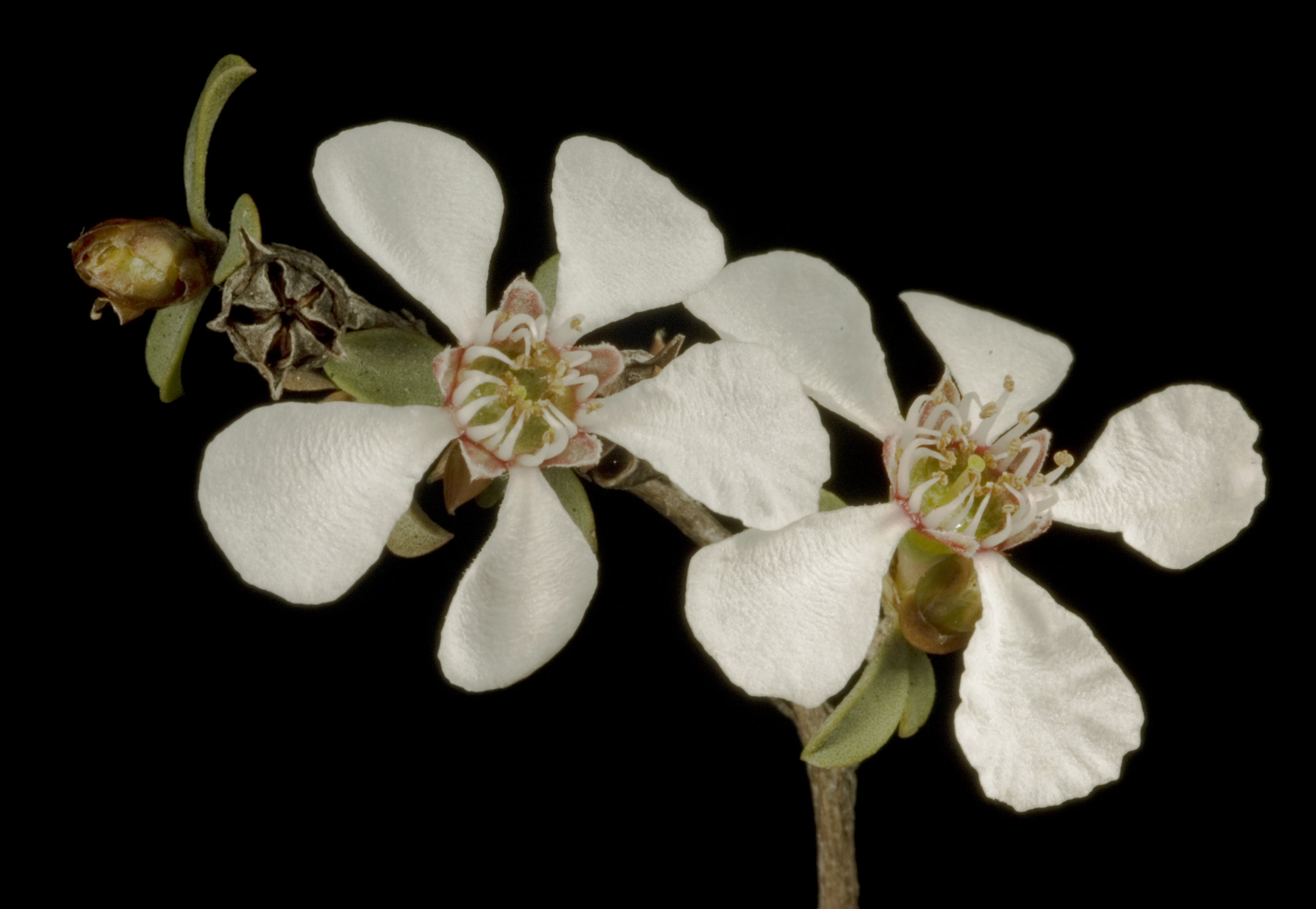
- Leptospermopsis erubescens

Scientific classification
- Kingdom: Plantae
- Clade: Tracheophytes
- Clade: Angiosperms
- Clade: Eudicots
- Clade: Rosids
- Order: Myrtales
- Family: Myrtaceae
- Subfamily: Myrtoideae
- Tribe: Leptospermeae
- Genus: Leptospermopsis; S.Moore

= Leptospermopsis =

Genus of flowering plants

Leptospermopsis is a genus of 8 species of flowering plants in the myrtle family Myrtaceae previously included in Leptospermum. It was first formally described in 1920 by Spencer Le Marchant Moore and redescribed in 2023 by Peter Gordon Wilson and Margaret M. Heslewood in the journal Taxon.

== Species ==
The following is a list of species of Leptospermopsis accepted by the Plants of the World Online as at August 2024.

- Leptospermopsis erubescens (Schauer) Peter G.Wilson
- Leptospermopsis fastigiata (S.Moore) Peter G.Wilson
- Leptospermopsis incana (Turcz.) Peter G.Wilson
- Leptospermopsis maxwellii (S.Moore) Peter G.Wilson
- Leptospermopsis nitens (Turcz.) Peter G.Wilson
- Leptospermopsis oligandra (Turcz.) Peter G.Wilson
- Leptospermopsis roei (Benth.) Peter G.Wilson
- Leptospermopsis sericea (Labill.) Peter G.Wilson
