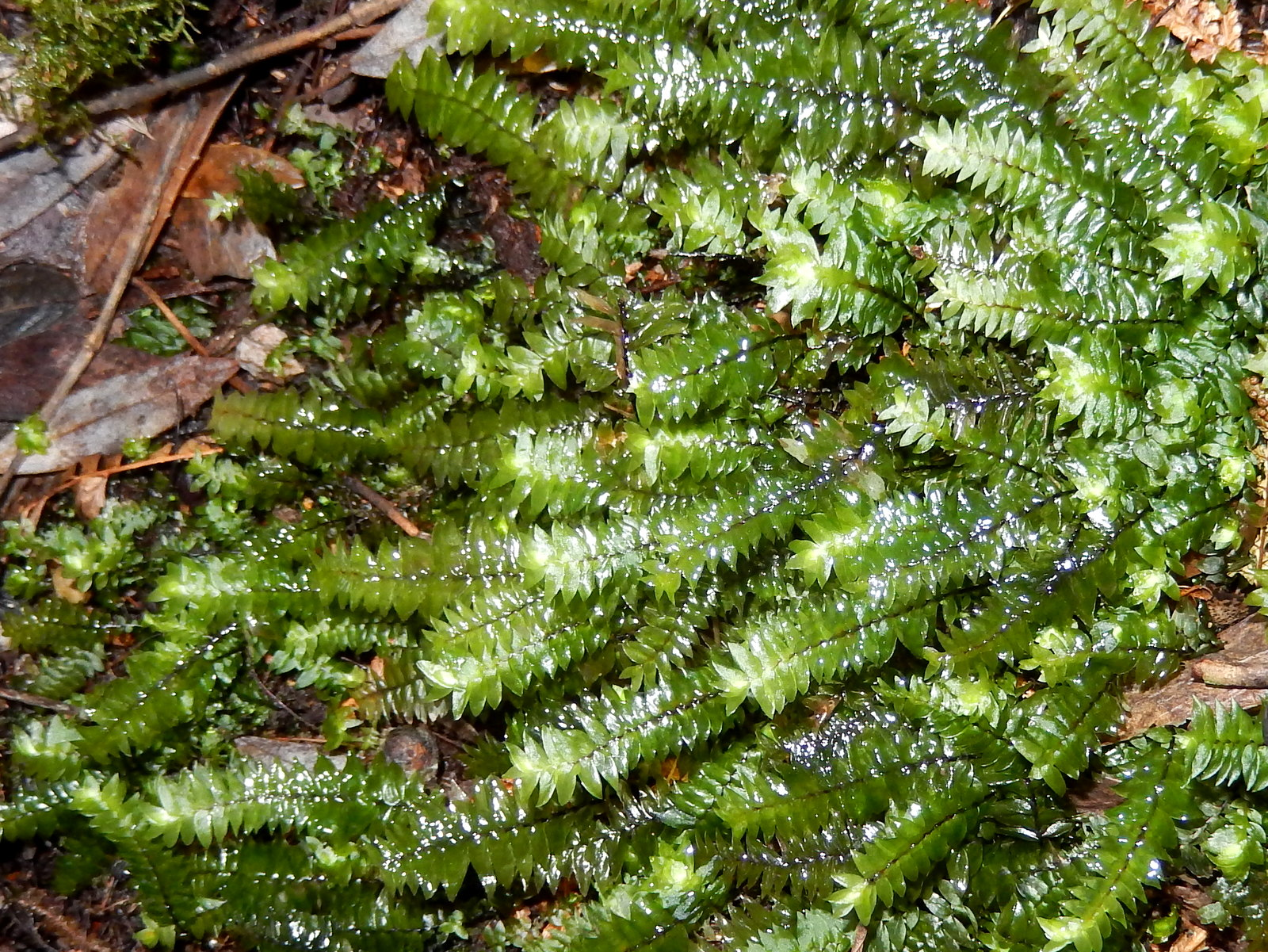
- False Fern-moss (Cyathophorum bulbosum)

Scientific classification
- Kingdom: Plantae
- Clade: Embryophytes
- Division: Bryophyta
- Class: Bryopsida
- Subclass: Bryidae
- Order: Hypopterygiales
- Family: Hypopterygiaceae
- Genus: Cyathophorum; P.Beauv.

= Cyathophorum =

Genus of mosses

Cyathophorum is a genus of moss in the family Hypopterygiaceae. Seven species are found across Africa, southern and eastern Asia, through to Australia and Oceania.
