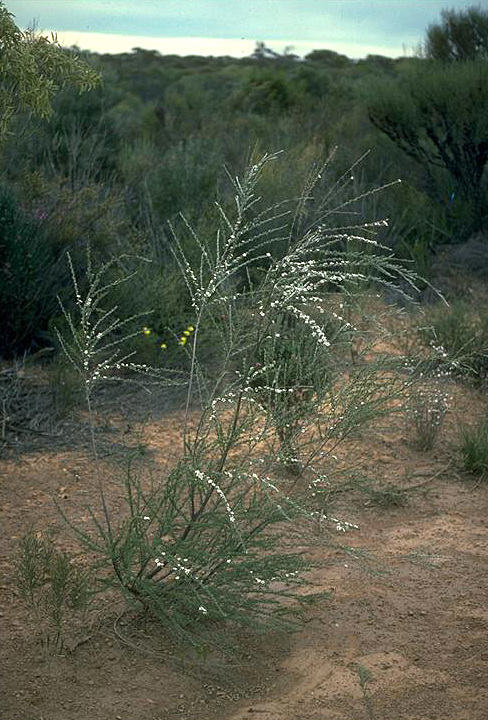
- Near Lake King

Scientific classification
- Kingdom: Plantae
- Clade: Tracheophytes
- Clade: Angiosperms
- Clade: Eudicots
- Clade: Rosids
- Order: Myrtales
- Family: Myrtaceae
- Genus: Leptospermum
- Species: L. inelegans

Binomial name
- Leptospermum inelegans Joy Thomps.
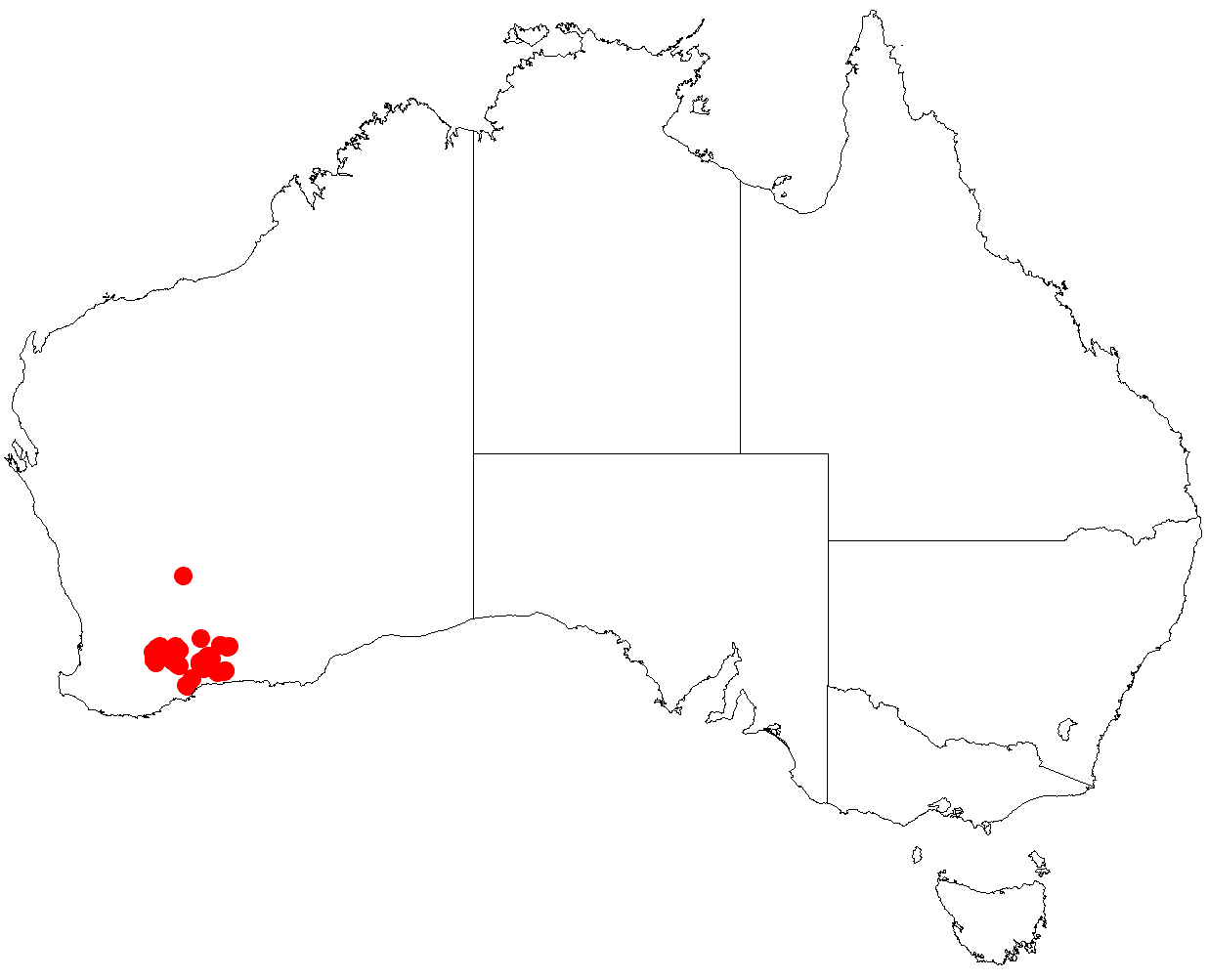
- Occurrence data from AVH

= Leptospermum inelegans =

Species of shrub

Leptospermum inelegans is a species of straggly shrub that is endemic to Western Australia. It has only partly hairy young stems, egg-shaped to narrow elliptical leaves on a short petiole, relatively small white or pink flowers and fruit that fall from the plant when mature.

== Description ==
Leptospermum inelegans is a straggly shrub that typically grows to a height of 1–2 m (3 ft 3 in – 6 ft 7 in) with thin, rough bark on the older branches and younger stems that are only partly hairy. The leaves are egg shaped to narrow elliptical, mostly 5–15 mm (0.20–0.59 in) long and 2–3 mm (0.079–0.118 in) wide. The flowers are white or pink, 7–10 mm (0.28–0.39 in) wide and are usually borne singly on short side shoots. The floral cup is 2–3 mm (0.079–0.118 in) long and is covered with flattened silky hairs on a pedicel up to 1 mm (0.039 in) long. The sepals are triangular, about 2 mm (0.079 in) long, the petals about 3 mm (0.12 in) long and the stamens less than 1 mm (0.039 in) long. Flowering mainly occurs from September to November and the fruit is a capsule 3–4 mm (0.12–0.16 in) long with the remains of the sepals attached, but that falls from the plant after the release of the seeds.

== Taxonomy and naming ==
Leptospermum inelegans was first formally described in 1989 by Joy Thompson in the journal Telopea from specimens collected by Roger Hnatiuk. The specific epithet (inelegans) is a Latin word meaning "not choice" or "tasteless", referring to the usual habit of this species.

== Distribution and habitat ==
This tea-tree is usually found in scrub or heath on hills and undulating plains and occurs in parts of the Coolgardie, Esperance Plains and Mallee biogeographic regions.

== Conservation status ==
Leptospermum inelegans is classified as "not threatened" by the Western Australian Government Department of Parks and Wildlife.
