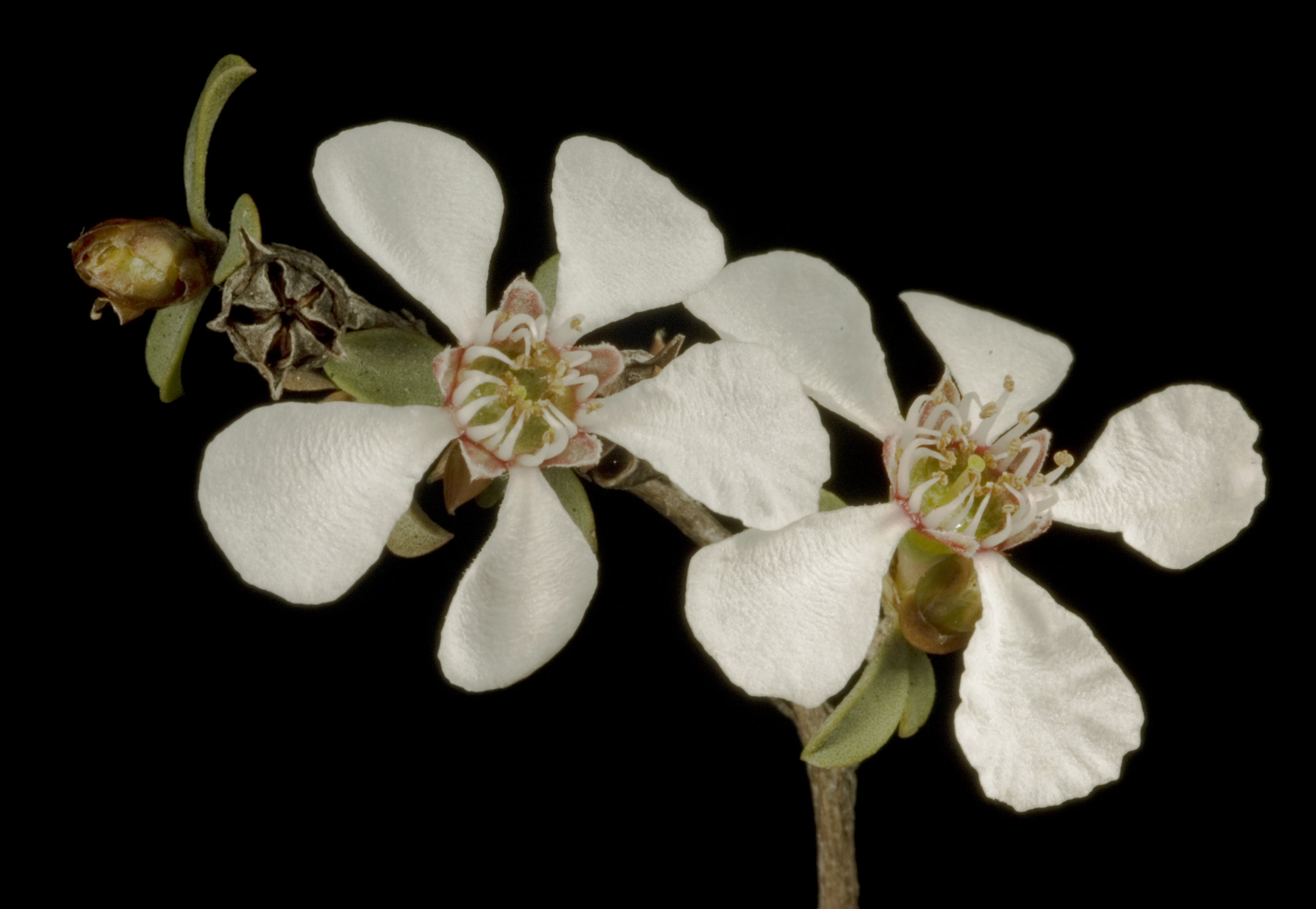

Scientific classification
- Kingdom: Plantae
- Clade: Tracheophytes
- Clade: Angiosperms
- Clade: Eudicots
- Clade: Rosids
- Order: Myrtales
- Family: Myrtaceae
- Genus: Leptospermopsis
- Species: L. erubescens

Binomial name
- Leptospermopsis erubescens (Schauer) Peter G.Wilson
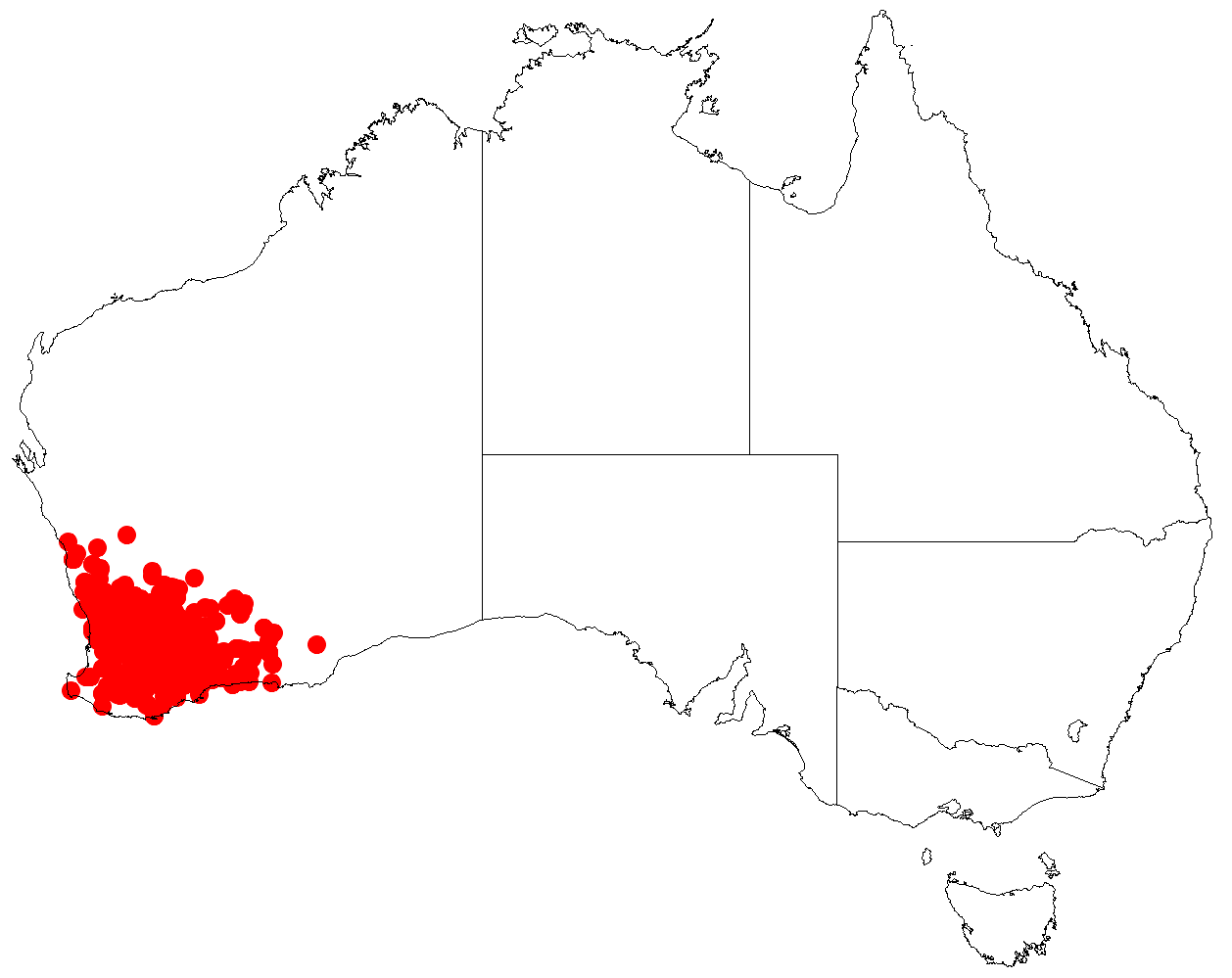
- Occurrence data from AVH

Synonyms
- Leptospermum erubescens Schauer

= Leptospermopsis erubescens =

Species of shrub

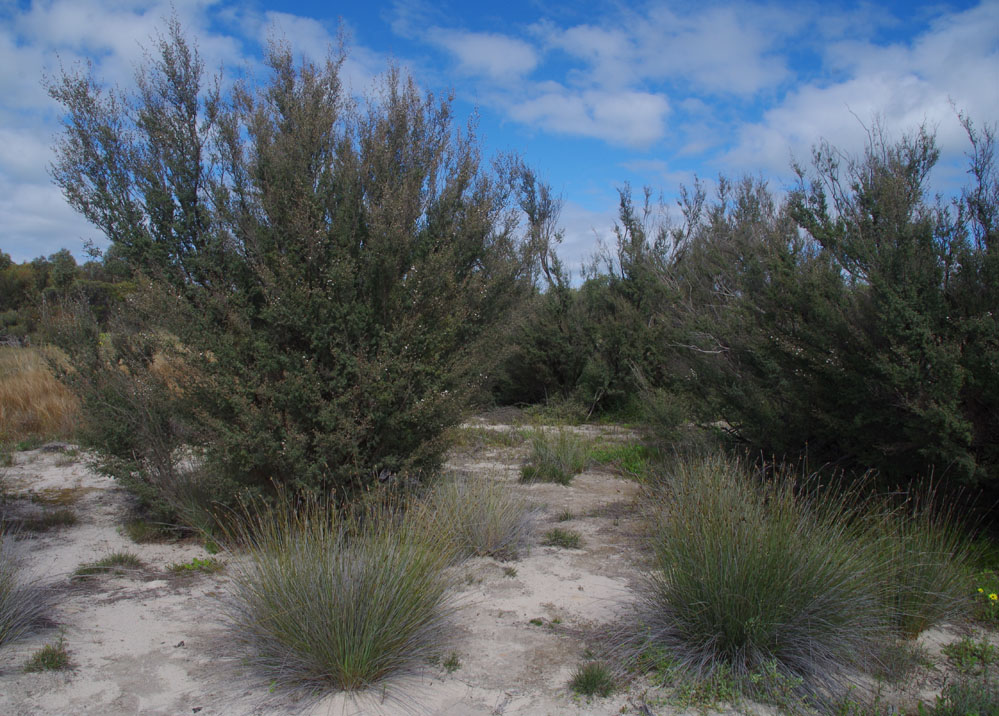
Habit east of Dowerin

Leptospermopsis erubescens, commonly known as the roadside tea tree, is a species of shrub that is endemic to southwest of Western Australia. It has thin, fibrous bark, egg-shaped leaves, small white flowers and woody fruit.

== Description ==
Leptospermopsis erubescens is a shrub that typically grows to a height of 2–3 m (6 ft 7 in – 9 ft 10 in) and has thin, fibrous bark that is shed in long strips. The young stems are thick, have soft hairs at first and spread widely apart from each other. The leaves are sessile, narrow to broadly egg-shaped, mostly 3–6 mm (0.12–0.24 in) long and 2–4 mm (0.079–0.157 in) wide. The flowers are borne singly or in pairs on the ends of short shoots that continue to grow after flowering. There are broad, reddish bracts and bracteoles at the base of the flower buds, the bracteoles falling off as the flowers develop. The flowers are white or pink, less than 10 mm (0.39 in) wide on a pedicel about 2 mm (0.079 in) long. The floral cup is hairy, 2–4 mm (0.079–0.157 in) long and the sepals are dark-coloured, about 1 mm (0.039 in) long with hairy edges. The petals are about 5 mm (0.20 in) long and the stamens in groups of three to five and 1.5–2 mm (0.059–0.079 in) long. Flowering occurs from July to October and the fruit is a woody capsule 4–5 mm (0.16–0.20 in) in diameter with the remains of the sepals attached.

== Taxonomy ==
This species was first formally described in 1844 by Johannes Conrad Schauer who gave it the name Leptospermum erubescens in Lehmann's Plantae Preissianae. In 2023, Peter Gordon Wilson transferred the species to the genus Leptospermopsis as L. erubescens in the journal Taxon. The specific epithet (erubescens) is from Latin meaning "reddening" or "blushing", referring to the flowers.

== Distribution and habitat ==
The roadside tea-tree grows on road verges, plains, in gullies and among rocky outcrops in heath and woodland. It is widespread in the Avon Wheatbelt, Coolgardie, Esperance Plains, Geraldton Sandplains, Jarrah Forest, Mallee, Swan Coastal Plain, Warren and Yalgoo biogeographic regions.

== Conservation status ==
This tea-tree is classified as "not threatened" by the Government of Western Australia Department of Parks and Wildlife.
