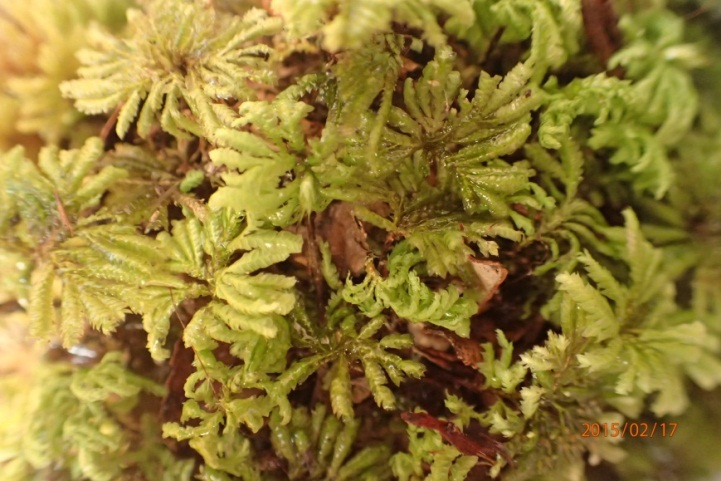
- Hypopterygium didictyon

Scientific classification
- Kingdom: Plantae
- Division: Bryophyta
- Class: Bryopsida
- Subclass: Bryidae
- Superorder: Hypnanae
- Order: Hypopterygiales; Goffinet
- Family: Hypopterygiaceae; Mitt.

= Hypopterygiaceae =

Family of mosses

The Hypopterygiaceae are a family of mainly tropical mosses of the order Hypopterygiales, a sister-group to the Hookeriales and Hypnales.

It contains eight genera.

- Arbusculohypopterygium Stech, T. Pfeiffer & W. Frey
- Canalohypopterygium W. Frey & Schaepe
- Catharomnion Hook.f. & Wilson
- Cyathophorum P. Beauv.
- Dendrocyathophorum Dixon
- Dendrohypopterygium Kruijer
- Hypopterygium Brid.
- Lopidium Hook.f. & Wilson
