= Novae Hollandiae Plantarum Specimen =

1804 botany books by Jacques Labillardière

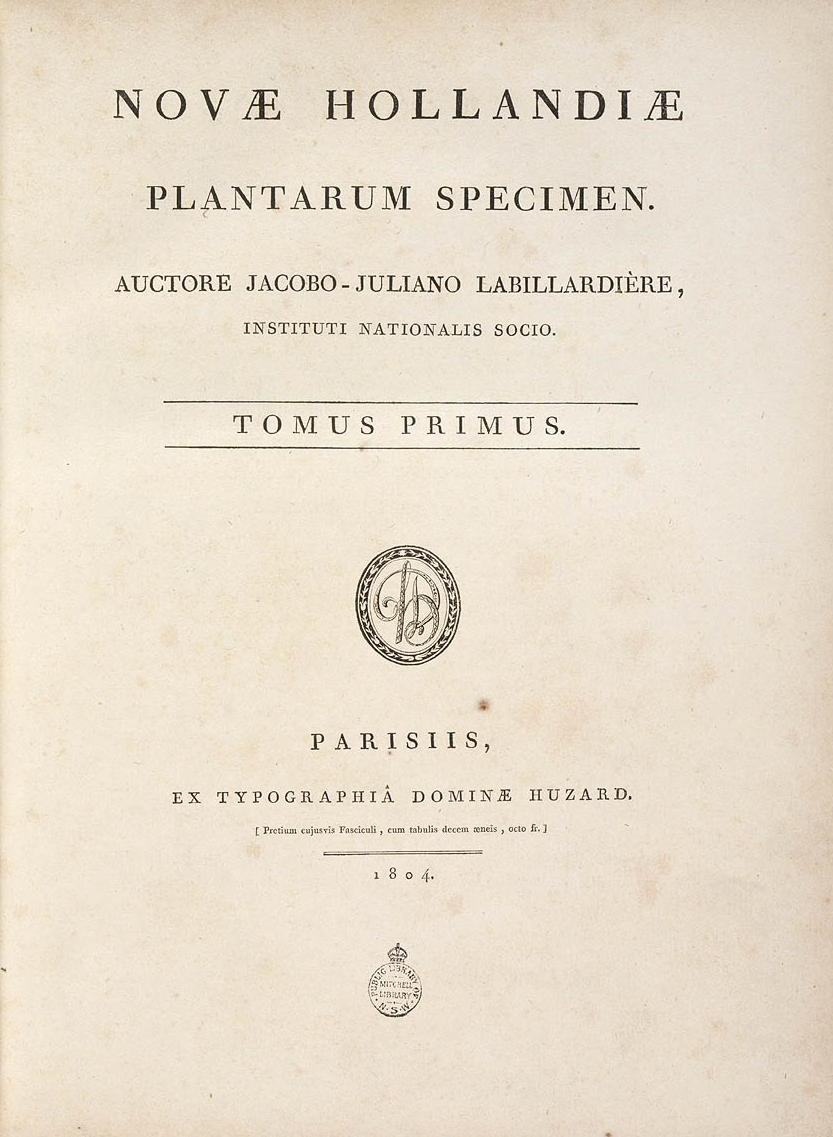
Title page

Novae Hollandiae Plantarum Specimen is a two-volume work describing the flora of Australia. Facsimiles of the originals can be found in the online Biodiversity Heritage Library (Vol.1) and Vol 2).

The author was the French botanist Jacques Labillardière, who visited the region in 1792 with the d'Entrecasteaux expedition. Published between 1804 and 1806, it is one of the earliest works to describe the plants of the continent; according to Denis and Maisie Carr, "[i]n practical terms, this was the first general flora of Australia."

The work describes the botanical collections made by himself and his companion on the d'Entrecasteaux expedition, Charles Riche, and the unattributed and later collections of Nicolas Baudin's expedition. Labillardière's collections were seized by the English, but were returned to him in France at the intervention of Joseph Banks. He made his collections at Observatory Island and other locations at the Archipelago of the Recherche. Extensive collection were also made at Recherche Bay, during his two visits to Tasmania.

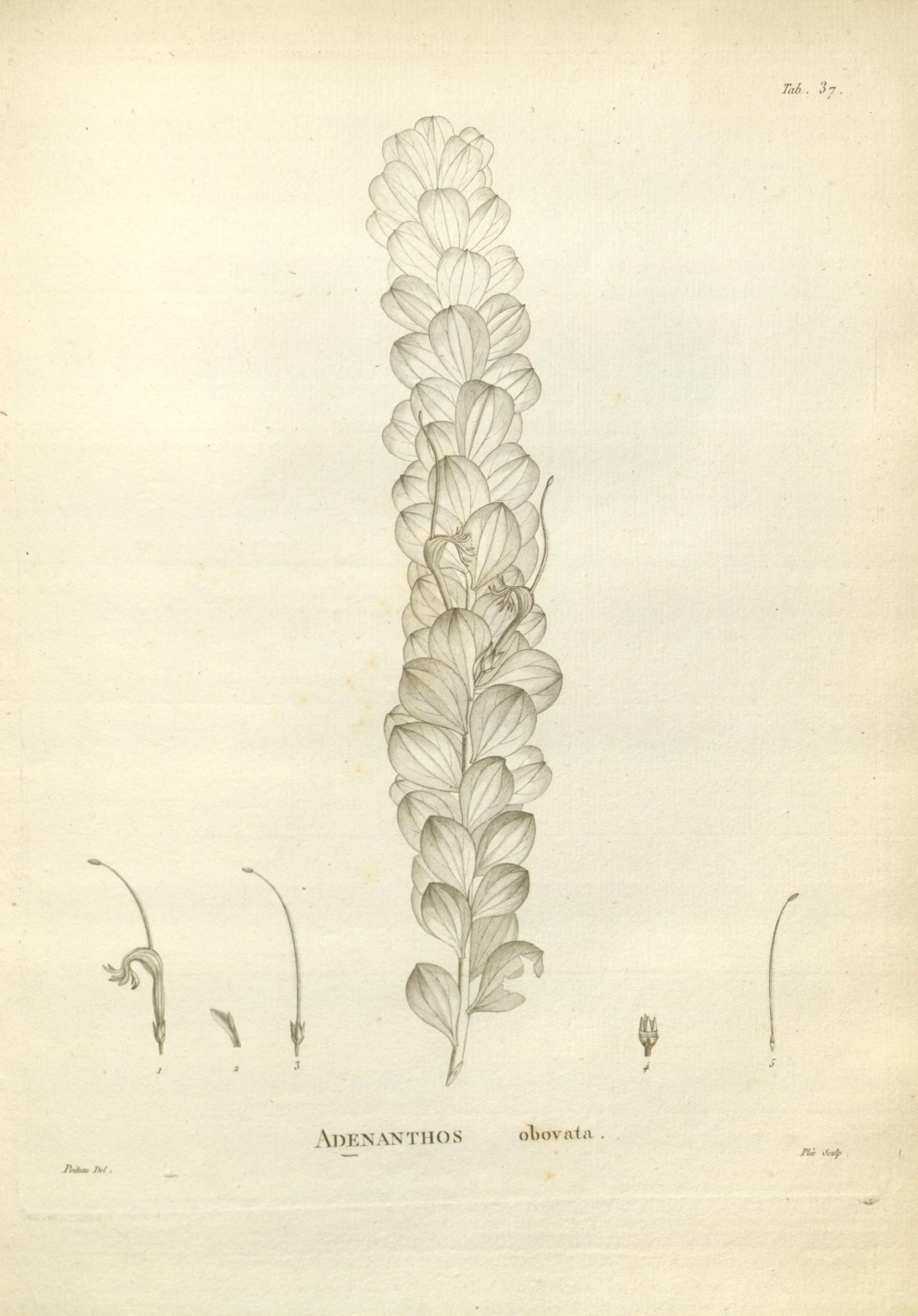
Tab. 37 Adenanthos obovata

The preface describes the journey "from Cape of Good Hope to Australia", an example of the continent being named as 'Australia' before its popularisation by Flinders' use in A Voyage to Terra Australis. The work includes 256 black-and-white botanical illustrations, including contributions by Pierre-Joseph Redouté. Copper plates drawn by Pierre Antoine Poiteau and engraved by Auguste Plée were produced for other illustrations.

Labillardière had named and described more Australian flora than any other botanist of the day; the work was the most comprehensive until Robert Brown published his Prodromus. This work featured the first descriptions of Cephalotus follicularis, a carnivorous plant, and species Adenanthos obovatus and Gahnia trifida from the southern coast. The collections made at southwest Australia also produced new genera Adenanthos (Proteaceae) and Calytrix (Myrtaceae), species Astartea fascicularis, Hakea clavata and Taxandria marginata, and the first description of the now widely introduced Acacia saligna. Tasmanian species include Eucryphia lucida (leatherwood) and Phyllocladus aspleniifolius (celery-top pine). The first confirmed collection of Australian bryophytes are described and illustrated by the author; the current name for these species are the mosses Cyathophorum bulbosum and Hypnodendron comosum and a liverwort Hymenophyton flabellatum.

Novae Hollandiae Plantarum Specimen has been praised for the accuracy of its descriptions and for the elegant scientific names coined therein. It has been criticised for its imprecision and occasional errors in collection locality and habitat; for example it attributes the collection of Eucalyptus ovata to southwest Australia, but it occurs only in Tasmania and southeast Australia. Labillardière has also been criticised for publishing species based upon specimens collected by other botanists, without providing attribution or acknowledgement for the specimens.

The standard abbreviation for the work, Nov. Holl. Pl., is used in botanical literature, and is also known by the title Specimens of the Plants of New Holland. It is the second publication by Labillardière to describe Australian flora; the first was Relation du Voyage à la Recherche de la Pérouse in 1799, a popular account of the voyage in search of the La Pérouse expedition. The earlier work contains the first description of plant species such as Eucalyptus cornuta.
