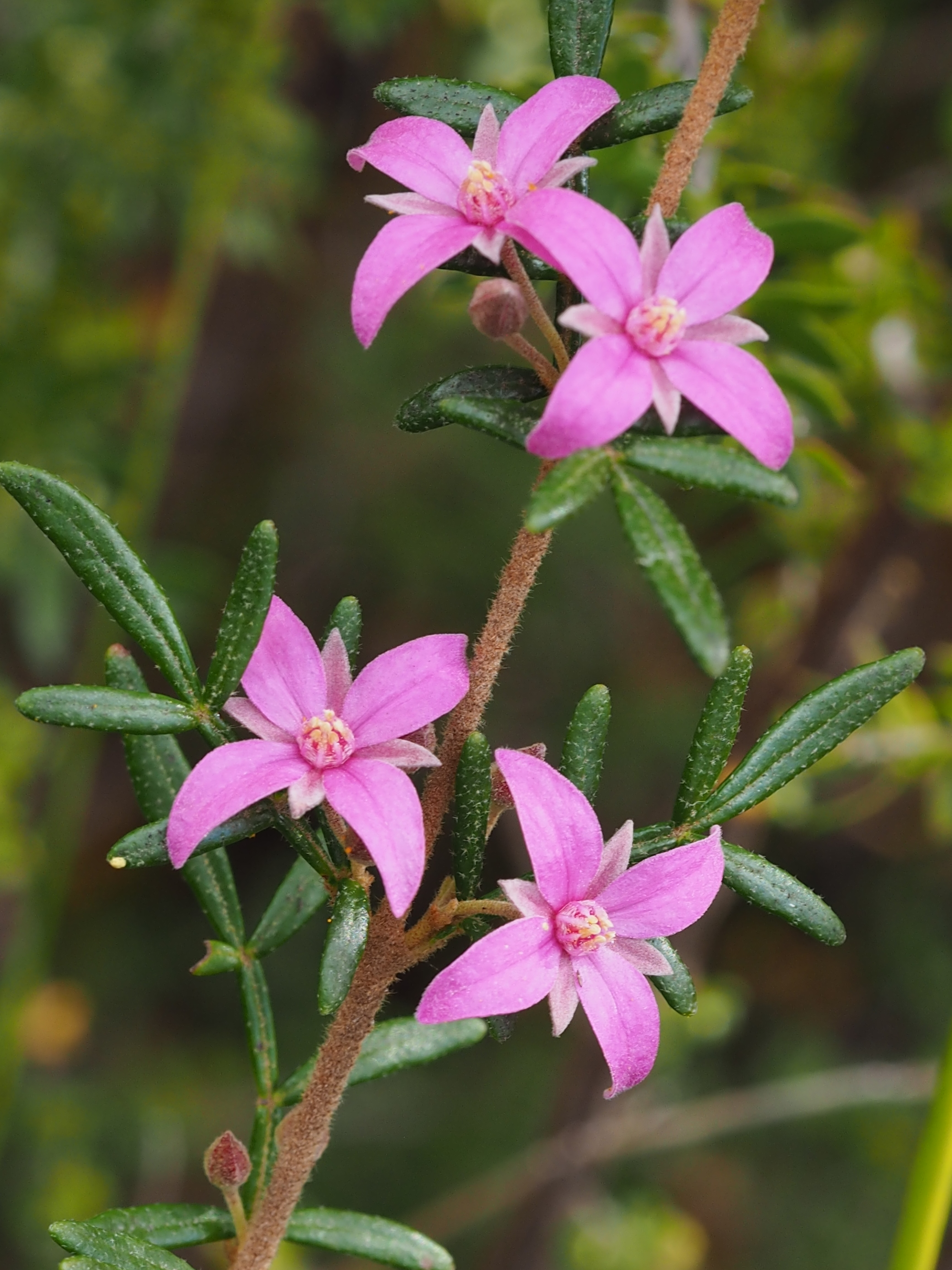
- Subspecies inflexus

Scientific classification
- Kingdom: Plantae
- Clade: Tracheophytes
- Clade: Angiosperms
- Clade: Eudicots
- Clade: Rosids
- Order: Sapindales
- Family: Rutaceae
- Genus: Cyanothamnus
- Species: C. inflexus

Binomial name
- Cyanothamnus inflexus (Duretto) Duretto & Heslewood
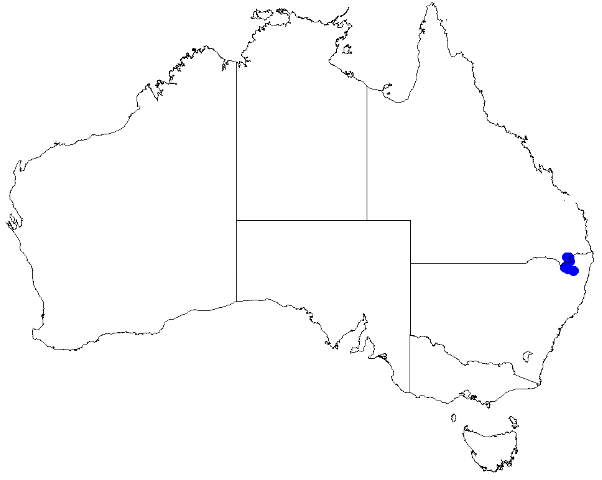
- Occurrence data from Australasian Virtual Herbarium

Synonyms
- Boronia inflexa Duretto

= Cyanothamnus inflexus =

Species of flowering plant

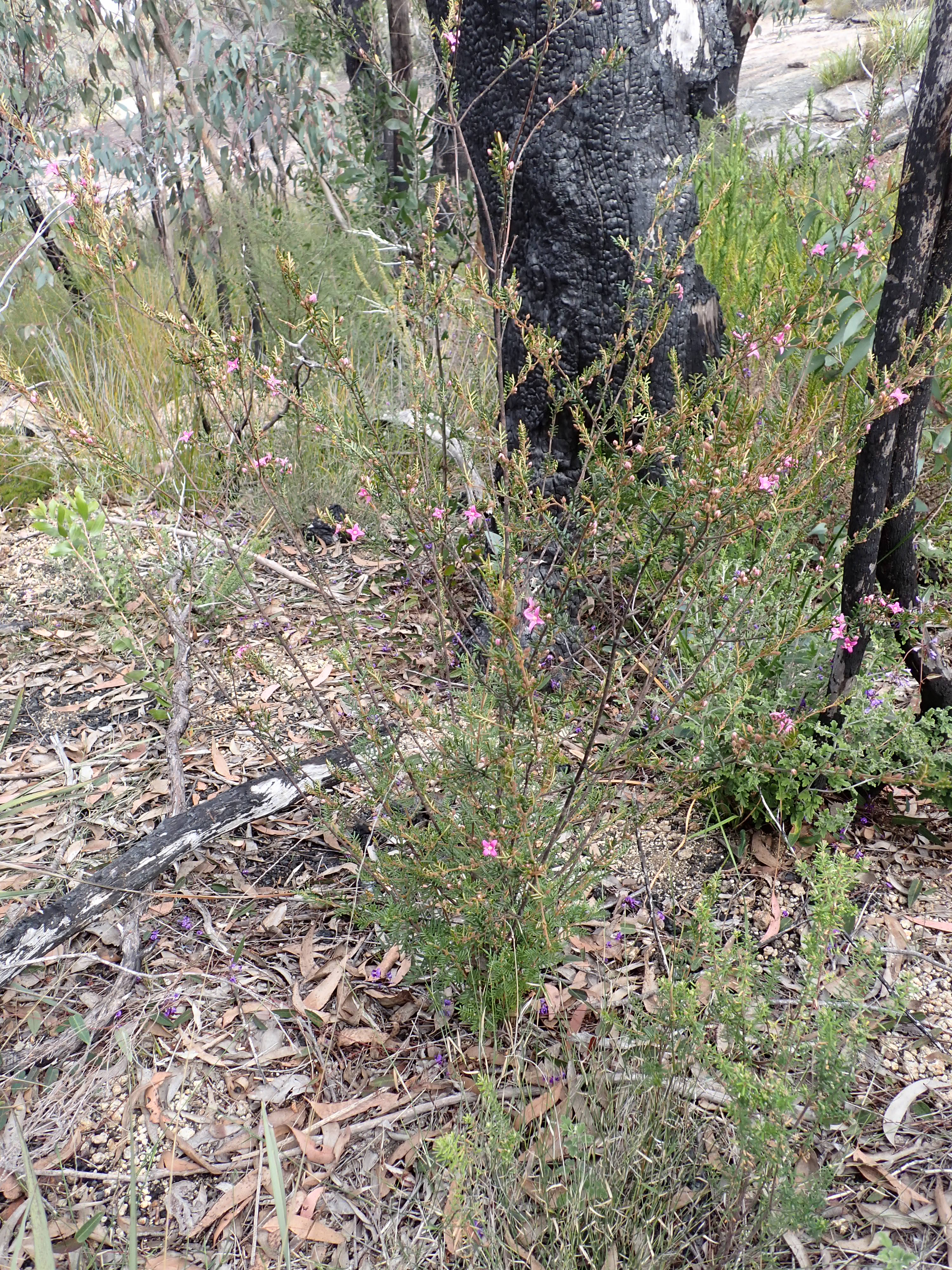
Habit subsp. inflexus near Mount Norman in Girraween National Park

Cyanothamnus inflexus is a plant in the citrus family Rutaceae and is endemic to tablelands near the New South Wales - Queensland border in Australia. It is an erect, woody shrub with pinnate leaves and up to seven white to pink four-petalled flowers in the leaf axils. Boronia bipinnata is similar but has larger, bipinnate or tripinnate leaves and smaller sepals and petals.

== Description ==
Cyanothamnus inflexus is an erect, woody shrub that grows to a height of about 2 m (7 ft) and a width of about 3 m (10 ft). The leaves are pinnate, 6–25 mm (0.2–1 in) long and 6–35 mm (0.2–1 in) wide in outline on a petiole 3–10 mm (0.1–0.4 in) long. The end leaflet is linear, 1–16 mm (0.04–0.6 in) long and 0.5–2.5 mm (0.02–0.1 in) wide, the side leaflets similar or longer. Up to three, sometimes up to seven white to pink flowers are arranged on a stalk 0.5–9 mm (0.020–0.35 in) long. The four sepals are triangular, mostly glabrous, 1.5–3 mm (0.059–0.12 in) long and 1–2 mm (0.039–0.079 in) wide. The four petals are 2.5–7.5 mm (0.098–0.30 in) long, sometimes with a few hairs. The eight stamens are hairy and the stigma is about the same width as the style. Flowering occurs from June to December and the fruit are 3–3.5 mm (0.12–0.14 in) long and 1–2 mm (0.039–0.079 in) wide.

== Taxonomy and naming ==
This species was first formally described in 2003 by Marco F. Duretto who gave it the name Boronia inflexa in the journal Muelleria from a specimen collected in Girraween National Park. In a 2013 paper in the journal Taxon, Marco Duretto and others changed the name to Cyanothamnus inflexus on the basis of cladistic analysis. The specific epithet (inflexus) is a Latin word referring to the edges of the sepals, near their tip.

In the same 2003 paper, Duretto described four new subspecies. The names have subsequently been changed to reflect the change in the genus name:

- Cyanothamnus inflexus Duretto subsp. inflexus (the autonym) has its branches and leaves covered with minute, soft hairs, and petals 2–3.5 mm (0.079–0.14 in) long;
- Cyanothamnus inflexus subsp. montiazureus is glabrous with the end leaflet 3–7 mm (0.12–0.28 in) long and 0.5–1 mm (0.020–0.039 in) wide;
- Cyanothamnus inflexus subsp. grandiflorus has its branches and leaves covered with minute, soft hairs, and petals 6.5–7 mm (0.26–0.28 in) long;
- Cyanothamnus inflexus subsp. torringtonensis is glabrous with the end leaflet 10–16 mm (0.39–0.63 in) long and 1–1.5 mm (0.039–0.059 in) wide.

== Distribution and habitat ==
Cyanothamnus inflexus grows in heath, woodland and forest on granite and in soils derived from granite. Subspecies inflexus occurs between Stanthorpe and the Girraween National Park and disjunctly in the Gibraltar Range National Park and subspecies montiazureus on a small hill near Applethorpe north of Stanthorpe. Subspecies grandiflorus occurs near Amiens and Lyra and subspecies torringtonensis is restricted to the Torrington area in New South Wales.

== Conservation ==
Cyanothamnus inflexus subsp. montiazureus (as Boronia inflexa subsp. montiazura is classed as "least concern" under the Queensland Government Nature Conservation Act 1992.
