= Cyanothamnus acanthocladus =

Conservation status
- Priority Two — Poorly Known Taxa (DEC)

Scientific classification
- Kingdom: Plantae
- Clade: Tracheophytes
- Clade: Angiosperms
- Clade: Eudicots
- Clade: Rosids
- Order: Sapindales
- Family: Rutaceae
- Genus: Cyanothamnus
- Species: C. acanthocladus

Binomial name
- Cyanothamnus acanthocladus (Paul G.Wilson) Duretto & Heslewood

Synonyms
- Boronia acanthoclada Paul G.Wilson

Species of flowering plant

Cyanothamnus acanthocladus is a plant in the citrus family, Rutaceae and is endemic to a small area in the south-west of Western Australia. It is a low, prickly shrub with small leaves and white, four-petalled flowers.

== Description ==
Cyanothamnus acanthocladus is a shrub that grows to a height of about 0.3 m (1 ft) with spreading branches and spiny branchlets. Its leaves are narrow egg-shaped with the narrower end towards the base, 3–6 mm (0.1–0.2 in) long and often clustered on the older wood. The flowers are white and are borne on the ends of short shoots on a pedicel 2–3 mm (0.08–0.1 in) long. The four sepals are narrow triangular, fleshy, glabrous and about 2 mm (0.08 in) long. The four petals are elliptic and about 4 mm (0.2 in) long and the eight stamens are hairy. Flowering occurs in September.

== Taxonomy and naming ==
This species was first formally described in 1998 by Paul G. Wilson and given the name Boronia acanthoclada in Nuytsia from a specimen collected in the Frank Hann National Park. In a 2013 paper in the journal Taxon Marco Duretto and others changed the name to Cyanothamnus acanthocladus on the basis of cladistic analysis. The specific epithet (acanthocladus) is derived from latinized Greek, acantho- meaning 'spiny' and cladus 'a branch'.

== Distribution and habitat ==
Cyanothamnus acanthocladus grows in sand over gravel and is only known from the type collection.

== Conservation ==
Cyanothamnus acanthocladus (as Boronia acanthoclada) is classified as "Priority Two" by the Western Australian Government Department of Parks and Wildlife meaning that it is poorly known and from only one or a few locations.
