= Cyanothamnus warangensis =

Scientific classification
- Kingdom: Plantae
- Clade: Tracheophytes
- Clade: Angiosperms
- Clade: Eudicots
- Clade: Rosids
- Order: Sapindales
- Family: Rutaceae
- Genus: Cyanothamnus
- Species: C. warangensis

Binomial name
- Cyanothamnus warangensis (Duretto) Duretto & Heslewood
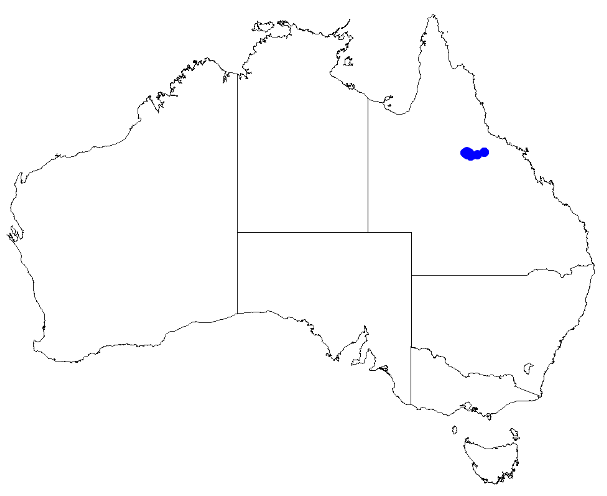
- Occurrence data from Australasian Virtual Herbarium

Species of flowering plant

Cyanothamnus warangensis is a species of erect, woody shrub that is endemic to Queensland. It has bipinnate leaves and groups of between five and twenty-five or more white flowers in leaf axils.

== Description ==
Cyanothamnus warangensis is an erect, woody shrub that typically grows to a height of about 2 m (6 ft 7 in). It has bipinnate leaves 15–56 mm (0.59–2.20 in) long and 18–90 mm (0.71–3.54 in) wide with between five and seven leaflets on a petiole 7–17 mm (0.28–0.67 in) long. The end leaflet is 7–30 mm (0.28–1.18 in) long and 1–2.5 mm (0.039–0.098 in) wide and the side leaflets are similar but longer. The flowers are white and are arranged in groups of up between five and twenty-five or more in leaf axils on a peduncle 2–2.5 mm (0.079–0.098 in) long. The four sepals are egg-shaped, about 1 mm (0.039 in) long and wide and the four petals are about 2 mm (0.079 in) long. The stamens are hairy on their edges and the stigma is minute, scarcely wider than the style. Flowering mainly occurs from March to September and the fruit is a glabrous capsule about 3 mm (0.12 in) long and 1.5 mm (0.059 in) wide.

== Taxonomy and naming ==
This species was first formally described in 2003 by Marco F. Duretto who gave it the name Boronia warangensis in the journal Muelleria from a specimen collected in the Warang section of the White Mountains National Park. In a 2013 paper in the journal Taxon, Marco Duretto and others changed the name to Cyanothamnus warangensis on the basis of cladistic analysis. The specific epithet (warangensis) refers to type location.

== Distribution and habitat ==
Cyanothamnus warangensis is confined to the White Mountains National Park where it grows in scrub or woodland in sandstone country.

== Conservation ==
Cyanothamnus warangensis (as Boronia warangensis) is listed as of "least concern" by the Queensland Government Department of Environment and Science.
