= Cyanothamnus westringioides =

Conservation status
- Priority Two — Poorly Known Taxa (DEC)

Scientific classification
- Kingdom: Plantae
- Clade: Tracheophytes
- Clade: Angiosperms
- Clade: Eudicots
- Clade: Rosids
- Order: Sapindales
- Family: Rutaceae
- Genus: Cyanothamnus
- Species: C. westringioides

Binomial name
- Cyanothamnus westringioides (Paul G.Wilson) Duretto & Heslewood
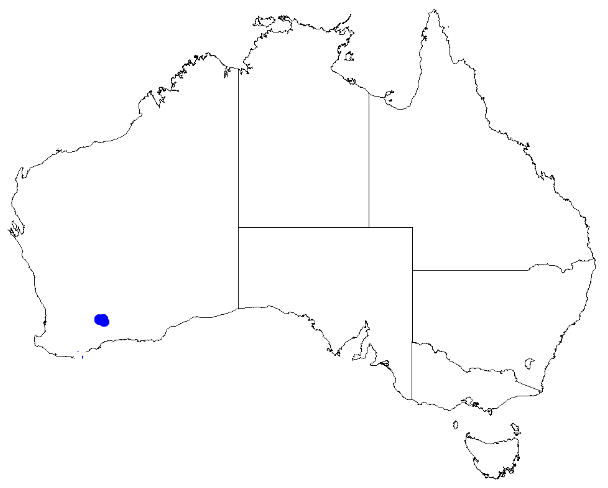
- Occurrence data from Australasian Virtual Herbarium

Species of flowering plant

Cyanothamnus westringioides is a species of erect shrub that is endemic to a small area in the southwest of Western Australia. It has simple, narrow, sessile leaves and pale pink flowers arranged singly in leaf axils.

== Description ==
Cyanothamnus westringioides is an erect shrub that typically grows to a height of 75 cm (30 in) and has ascending branches. The leaves are sessile and elliptic, sometimes trifoliate, more or less terete and 5–10 mm (0.20–0.39 in) long. The flowers are borne singly in upper leaf axils on a top-shaped pedicel 1–3 mm (0.039–0.118 in) long. There are leaf-like bracts about 1.5 mm (0.059 in) long at the base of the flowers. The sepals are prominently glandular, triangular to egg-shaped or pointed and 2–3 mm (0.079–0.118 in) long. The petals are pale pink, thin and glandular, elliptical and 5–6 mm (0.20–0.24 in) long. The stamens are glandular near the tip. Flowering occurs from July to October.

== Taxonomy and naming ==
This species was first formally described in 1998 by Paul Wilson and given the name Boronia westringioides in the journal Nuytsia from a specimen collected near the road between Hyden and Norseman. In a 2013 paper in the journal Taxon, Marco Duretto and others changed the name to Cyanothamnus westringioides on the basis of cladistic analysis. The specific epithet (westringioides) refers to the similarity of this species to some in the genus Westringia.

== Distribution and habitat ==
Cyanothamnus westringioides grows on loamy sandplains in a small area north of Lake King and east of Hyden.

== Conservation ==
Cyanothamnus westringioides is classified as "Priority Two" by the Western Australian Government Department of Parks and Wildlife meaning that it is poorly known and from only one or a few locations.
