= Cyanothamnus montimulliganensis =

Scientific classification
- Kingdom: Plantae
- Clade: Tracheophytes
- Clade: Angiosperms
- Clade: Eudicots
- Clade: Rosids
- Order: Sapindales
- Family: Rutaceae
- Genus: Cyanothamnus
- Species: C. montimulliganensis

Binomial name
- Cyanothamnus montimulliganensis (Duretto) Duretto & Heslewood

Species of flowering plant

Cyanothamnus montimulliganensis is a plant in the citrus family Rutaceae and is endemic to a single mountain in Queensland. It is an erect, woody shrub with pinnate or bipinnate leaves and white, four-petalled flowers usually arranged singly in leaf axils.

== Description ==
Cyanothamnus montimulliganensis is an erect, woody shrub that grows to a height of at least 35 cm (14 in) tall. The branches are slightly hairy but covered with pimply glands. The leaves are pinnate or bipinnate with between three and seven leaflets and 20–40 mm (0.79–1.57 in) long and 30–34 mm (1.2–1.3 in) wide in outline on a petiole 7–12 mm (0.3–0.5 in) long. The end leaflet is linear, 5–15 mm (0.20–0.59 in) long and about 1 mm (0.039 in) wide and the same colour on both surfaces. The side leaflets are similar to the end leaflet but longer. The flowers are white and are usually arranged singly, sometimes in groups of up to three, in leaf axils, on a pedicel about 1 mm (0.04 in) long. The four sepals are circular, about 1 mm (0.039 in) long and wide and glabrous. The four petals are 2–2.5 mm (0.079–0.098 in) long and glabrous. The eight stamens are hairy. Flowering has been observed in April and June, and the fruit is a glabrous capsule about 3.5 mm (0.14 in) long and 1.75 mm (0.069 in) wide.

== Taxonomy and naming ==
This species was first formally described in 2003 by Marco F. Duretto who gave it the name Boronia montimulliganensis in the journal Muelleria. The specific epithet (montimulliganensis) refers to the isolated Mount Mulligan, the only place where this species is known to occur. In a 2013 paper in the journal Taxon, Marco Duretto and others changed the name to Cyanothamnus montimulliganensis on the basis of cladistic analysis.

== Distribution and habitat ==
Cyanothamnus montimulliganensis grows in woodland on sandstone on Mount Mulligan in north Queensland.

== Conservation ==
Cyanothamnus montimulliganensis (as Boronia montimulliganensis) is listed as of "least concern" under the Queensland Government Nature Conservation Act 1992.
