= Cyanothamnus inconspicuus =

Conservation status
- Priority Two — Poorly Known Taxa (DEC)

Scientific classification
- Kingdom: Plantae
- Clade: Tracheophytes
- Clade: Angiosperms
- Clade: Eudicots
- Clade: Rosids
- Order: Sapindales
- Family: Rutaceae
- Genus: Cyanothamnus
- Species: C. inconspicuus

Binomial name
- Cyanothamnus inconspicuus (Benth.) Duretto & Heslewood
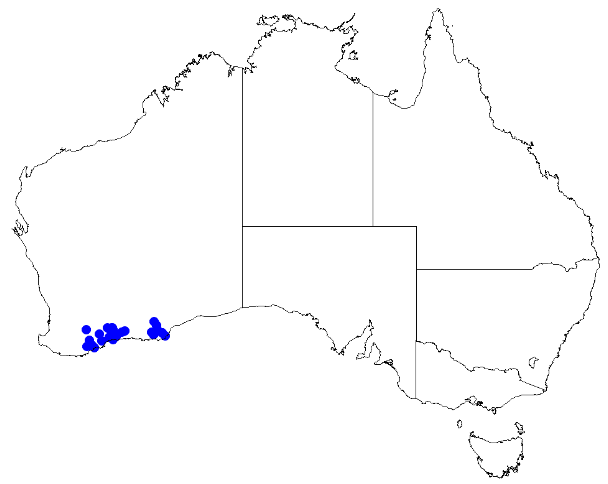
- Occurrence data from Australasian Virtual Herbarium

Synonyms
- Boronia inconspicua Benth.

Species of plant

Cyanothamnus inconspicuus is a plant in the citrus family, Rutaceae and is endemic to the south-west of Western Australia. It is a shrub with pinnate leaves and small white or creamy green flowers with four petals and eight stamens and occurs from the Stirling Range to Mount Ragged.

== Description ==
Cyanothamnus inconspicuus is an erect, spreading or rounded, compact shrub that grows to a height of 1 m (3 ft) with its branches hairless or with a few soft hairs. The leaves are pinnate with three, five or seven leathery, narrow oblong to narrow wedge-shaped leaflets 3–10 mm (0.1–0.4 in) long. The flowers are borne singly or in cymes of a few flowers, the flowers on a glabrous pedicel 2–4 mm (0.08–0.2 in) long. The four sepals are triangular, leathery and about 0.6 mm (0.024 in) long. The petals are white to creamy green, about 1.5 mm (0.059 in) long with pimply glands. The eight stamens have a few hairs and the stigma is small. Flowering mainly occurs from September to December.

== Taxonomy and naming ==
This species was first formally described in 1863 by George Bentham who gave it the name Boronia inconspicua in Flora Australiensis from a specimen collected by James Drummond. In a 2013 paper in the journal Taxon, Marco Duretto and others changed the name to Cyanothamnus inconspicuus on the basis of cladistic analysis. The specific epithet (inconspicuus) is Latin word meaning "not readily visible" or "not prominent".

== Distribution and habitat ==
This boronia usually grows on rocky outcrops and is found from the Stirling Range to Mount Ragged in the Esperance Plains and Mallee biogeographic regions.

== Conservation ==
Cyanothamnus inconspicuus is classified as "not threatened" by the Western Australian Government Department of Parks and Wildlife.
