= Cyanothamnus defoliatus =

Scientific classification
- Kingdom: Plantae
- Clade: Tracheophytes
- Clade: Angiosperms
- Clade: Eudicots
- Clade: Rosids
- Order: Sapindales
- Family: Rutaceae
- Genus: Cyanothamnus
- Species: C. defoliatus

Binomial name
- Cyanothamnus defoliatus (F.Muell.) Duretto & Heslewood
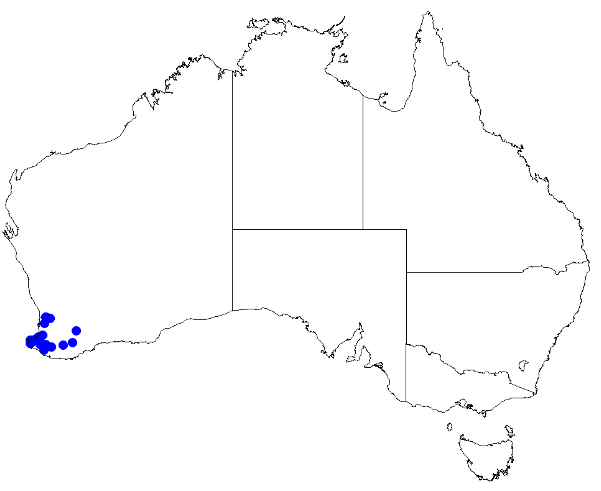
- Occurrence data from Australasian Virtual Herbarium

Synonyms
- Boronia defoliata F.Muell.

Species of flowering plant

Cyanothamnus defoliatus is a plant in the citrus family, Rutaceae and is endemic to the south-west of Western Australia. It is a straggly shrub with simple, thread-like leaves and white to pink, four-petalled flowers that are pale blue on the back.

== Description ==
Cyanothamnus defoliatus is a straggly shrub with thin stems and that grows to a height of about 60 cm (20 in). Its branches and leaves are glabrous. The leaves are simple, often fall off early and thread-like or more or less thin cylindrical, about 5 mm (0.2 in) long. The flowers are borne in branching groups on the ends of the branches and in leaf axils on thin pedicels 3–5 mm (0.1–0.2 in) long. The four sepals are broadly egg-shaped and leathery, about 2 mm (0.08 in) long. The four petals are elliptic, white to pink on the upper surface and pale blue with a darker strip below and 5–7 mm (0.20–0.28 in) long. The eight stamens have woolly hairs and the style is thin with a minute stigma. Flowering occurs from September to October.

== Taxonomy and naming ==
This species was first formally described in 1875 by Ferdinand von Mueller who gave it the name Boronia defoliata in Fragmenta phytographiae Australiae. The type specimen was collected by James Drummond. In a 2013 paper in the journal Taxon, Marco Duretto and others changed the name to Cyanothamnus defoliatus on the basis of cladistic analysis. The specific epithet (defoliatus) means "without leaves".

== Distribution and habitat ==
Cyanothamnus defoliatus grows in sand, gravel and laterite between Capel and Manjimup in the Jarrah Forest, Mallee, Swan Coastal Plain and Warren biogeographic regions.

== Conservation ==
Cyanothamnus defoliatus is classified as "not threatened" by the Western Australian Government Department of Parks and Wildlife.
