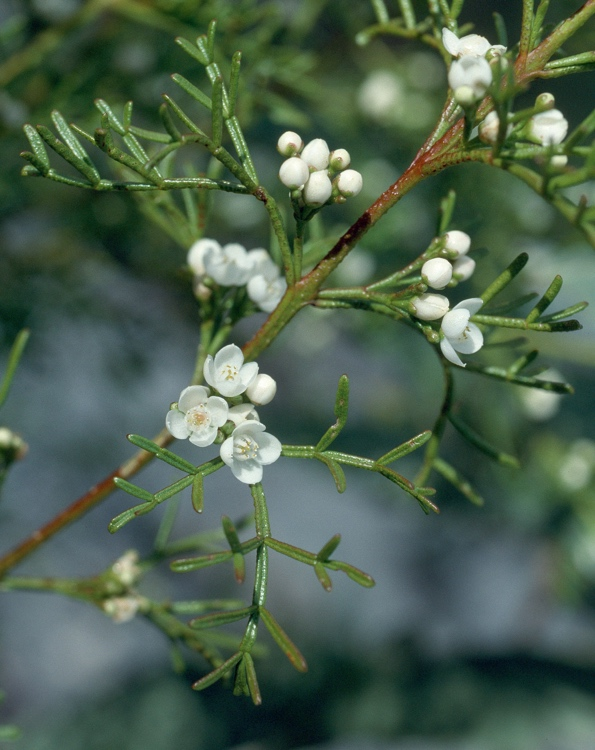
- Cyanothamnus bipinnatus in the Ka Ka Mundi section of Carnarvon National Park

Scientific classification
- Kingdom: Plantae
- Clade: Tracheophytes
- Clade: Angiosperms
- Clade: Eudicots
- Clade: Rosids
- Order: Sapindales
- Family: Rutaceae
- Genus: Cyanothamnus
- Species: C. bipinnatus

Binomial name
- Cyanothamnus bipinnatus (Lindl.) Duretto & Heslewood
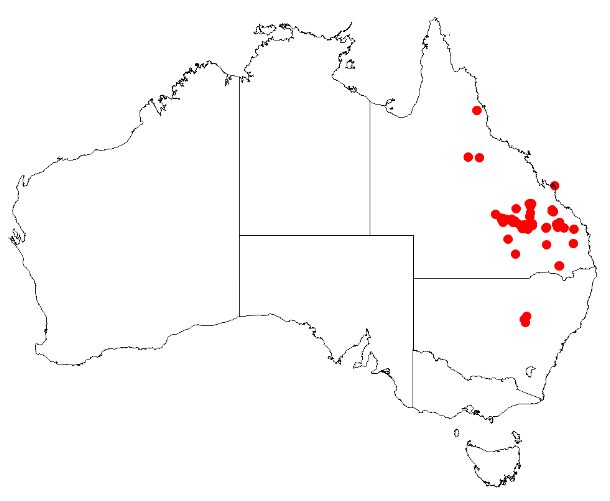
- Occurrence data from Australasian Virtual Herbarium

Synonyms
- Boronia bipinnata Lindl.; Boronia bipinnata var. pubescens Domin; Boronia bipinnata var. typica Domin

= Cyanothamnus bipinnatus =

Rock boronia

Species of flowering plant

Cyanothamnus bipinnatus, commonly known as rock boronia, is a plant in the citrus family, Rutaceae and is endemic to Queensland. It is an erect shrub with bipinnate or tripinnate leaves and white, four-petalled flowers. A more widespread species previously known as Boronia pinnata and also occurring in New South Wales is now considered to be B. occidentalis.

== Description ==
Cyanothamnus bipinnatus is an erect shrub that grows to a height of about 1 m (3.3 ft) with pimply, glandular stems and bipinnate or tripinnate leaves. The leaves are mostly 21–50 mm (0.83–2.0 in) long and 20–60 mm (0.79–2.4 in) wide in outline with between seven and eleven leaflets, on a petiole 4–15 mm (0.16–0.59 in) long. Between seven and twenty or more white flowers are arranged in groups in the leaf axils, the groups on a peduncle 2–8 mm (0.08–0.3 in) long. The four sepals are elliptic to more or less circular, about 1 mm (0.04 in) long and wide. The four petals are 2.5–4 mm (0.1–0.2 in) long and the eight stamens have hairy edges. Flowering occurs from September to June and the fruit are dull grey and wrinkled, about 2 mm (0.079 in) long and 1 mm (0.039 in) wide.

== Taxonomy and naming ==
This species was first formally described in 1848 by John Lindley who gave it the name Boronia bipinnata in Thomas Mitchell's Journal of an Expedition into the Interior of Tropical Australia. In a 2013 paper in the journal Taxon, Marco Duretto and others changed the name to Cyanothamnus bipinnatus on the basis of cladistic analysis. The specific epithet (bipinnatus) is derived from the Latin prefix bi- meaning "two" or "double" and pinnatus meaning "feathered", "plumed" or "winged".

== Distribution and habitat ==
Rock boronia grows in woodland, sometimes on steep slopes and is found in the central highlands of Queensland with disjunct populations on the Blackdown Tableland and near St George.
