= Cyanothamnus penicillatus =

Scientific classification
- Kingdom: Plantae
- Clade: Tracheophytes
- Clade: Angiosperms
- Clade: Eudicots
- Clade: Rosids
- Order: Sapindales
- Family: Rutaceae
- Genus: Cyanothamnus
- Species: C. penicillatus

Binomial name
- Cyanothamnus penicillatus (Benth.) Duretto & Heslewood
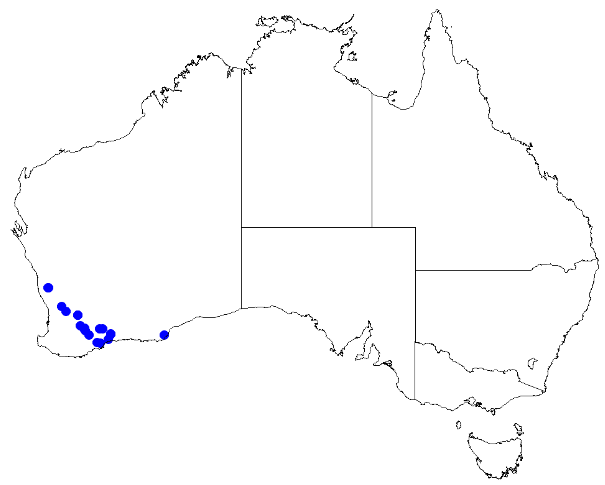
- Occurrence data from Australasian Virtual Herbarium

Synonyms
- Boronia penicillata Benth.

Species of flowering plant

Cyanothamnus penicillatus is a plant in the citrus family, Rutaceae and is endemic to the south-west of Western Australia. It is a low, spreading shrub with pinnate leaves and white flowers with four petals and eight stamens.

== Description ==
Cyanothamnus penicillatus is a spreading shrub that grows to a height of 30 cm (10 in). The leaves are sessile and pinnate with three or five leaflets, each leaflet linear to narrow wedge-shaped and 5–12 mm (0.2–0.5 in) long. The flowers are borne singly in leaf axils on a pedicel 1–2 mm (0.04–0.08 in) long. The four sepals are egg-shaped, 1.5–2 mm (0.059–0.079 in) long and the four petals are white and 2–3.5 mm (0.079–0.14 in) long. The eight stamens are slightly hairy and there is a very short point on the end of the anthers. Flowering occurs mainly from October to November.

== Taxonomy and naming ==
This species was first formally described in 1863 by George Bentham who gave it the name Boronia penicillata in Flora Australiensis from a specimen collected by James Drummond. In a 2013 paper in the journal Taxon, Marco Duretto and others changed the name to Cyanothamnus anemonifolus on the basis of cladistic analysis. The specific epithet (penicillatus) is derived from the Latin word penicillum meaning "little tail", "painter's brush" or "tuft".

== Distribution and habitat ==
This boronia grows in sand and has a disjunct distribution between Toodyay and the Fitzgerald River.

== Conservation ==
Cyanothamnus penicillatus is classified as "not threatened" by the Western Australian Government Department of Parks and Wildlife.
