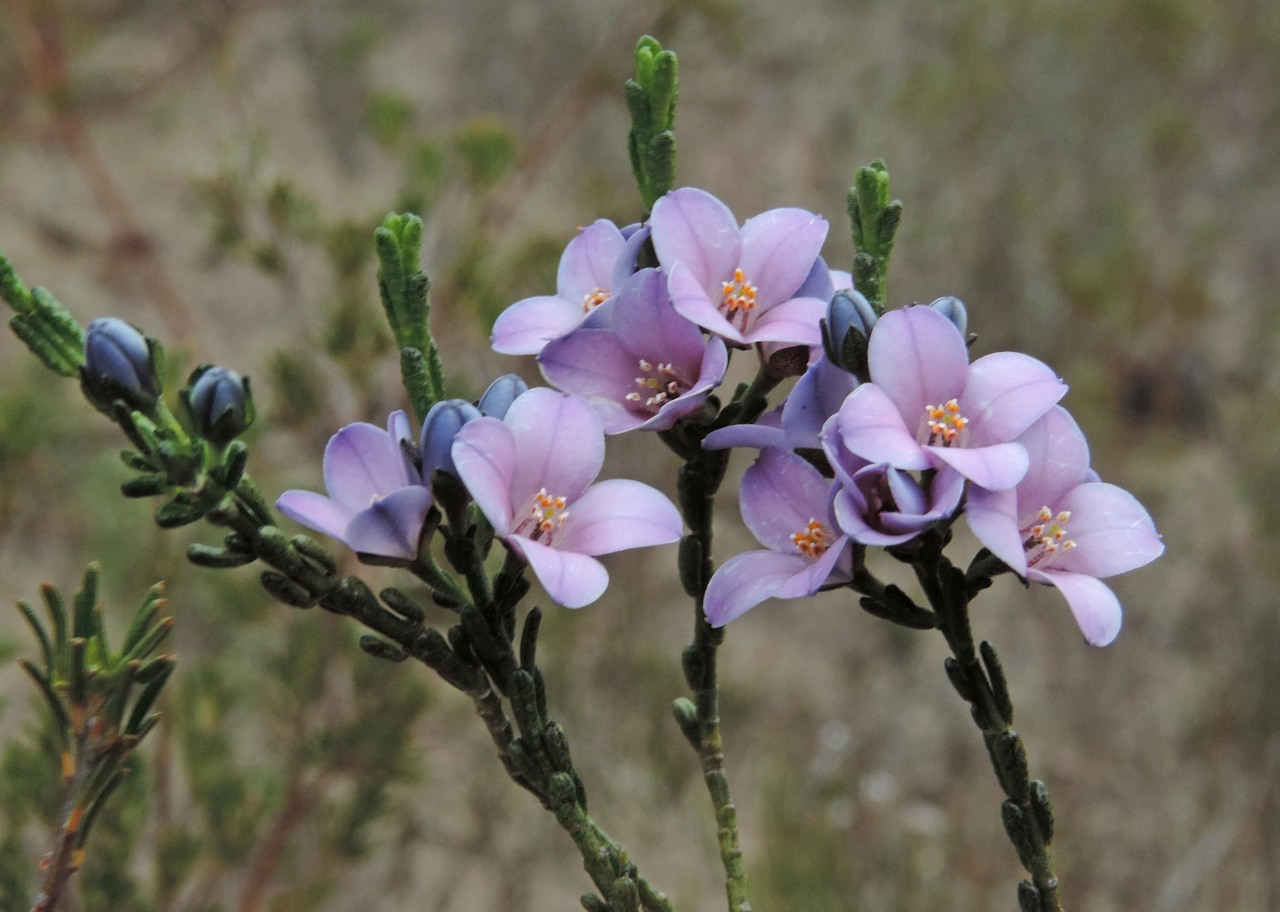
- Boronia coerulescens in the Little Desert National Park

Scientific classification
- Kingdom: Plantae
- Clade: Tracheophytes
- Clade: Angiosperms
- Clade: Eudicots
- Clade: Rosids
- Order: Sapindales
- Family: Rutaceae
- Genus: Cyanothamnus
- Species: C. coerulescens

Binomial name
- Cyanothamnus coerulescens (F.Muell.) Duretto & Heslewood
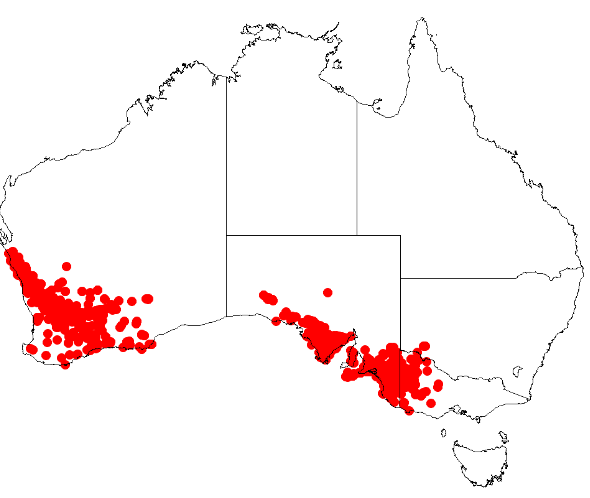
- Occurrence data from Australasian Virtual Herbarium

= Cyanothamnus coerulescens =

Blue boronia

Species of plant

Cyanothamnus coerulescens, commonly known as blue boronia, is a plant in the citrus family, Rutaceae and is endemic to southern Australia. It is a small, spindly shrub with glandular stems, small, more or less cylindrical leaves and blue to pinkish mauve, four-petalled flowers. There are two subspecies endemic to Western Australia and a third that also occurs in three eastern states.

== Description ==
Cyanothamnus coerulescens is an erect shrub that grows to a height of 0.2–0.6 m (0.7–2 ft) with branchlets that are warty glandular. The leaves are usually simple, (sometimes with three lobes), more or less cylindrical in shape to narrow oblong or elliptic, 5–10 mm (0.20–0.39 in) long and 0.5–1.5 mm (0.020–0.059 in) wide. The flowers are bright blue, lilac-coloured or white and are arranged singly in leaf axils or in dense, leafy spikes on the end of the branches. Each flower has a pedicel 2–5 mm (0.08–0.2 in) long. The four sepals are triangular to broadly egg-shaped, 1.5–7 mm (0.06–0.3 in) long with their bases overlapping. The four petals are more or less egg-shaped with a small, pointed tip, 3–9 mm (0.1–0.4 in) long with their bases overlapping. The eight stamens and the style are slightly hairy. Flowering mostly occurs from August to November and the fruit are 3–4 mm (0.12–0.16 in) long with the petals remaining on the end.

== Taxonomy and naming ==
Blue boronia was first formally described in 1854 by Ferdinand von Mueller who gave it the name Boronia coerulescens in Transactions of the Philosophical Society of Victoria. In a 2013 paper in the journal Taxon, Marco Duretto and others changed the name to Cyanothamnus bussellianus on the basis of cladistic analysis. The specific epithet (coerulescens) is a Latin word caeruleus meaning "sky blue" with the ending -escens signifying "beginning of" or "becoming".

In 2019, Paul Graham Wilson described three subspecies in the journal Nuytsia. The names have subsequently been changed to reflect the change in the genus name:

- Cyanothamnus coerulescens F.Muell. subsp. coerulescens (the autonym) has flowers in leaf axils;
- Cyanothamnus coerulescens subsp. spicatus (Paul G.Wilson) Duretto & Heslewood that has flowers in dense, leafy, spike-like racemes;
- Cyanothamnus coerulescens subsp. spinescens (Benth.) Duretto & Heslewood, originally described in 1863 as Boronia spinescens by George Bentham, is a variable subspecies with spreading, often pungent branchlets and is similar to subspecies coerulescens.

== Distribution and habitat ==
Blue boronia grows in mallee woodland. Subspecies coerulescens occurs in the south-west of Western Australia, in South Australia, Victoria and in the far south-west of New South Wales. Subspecies spicata occurs in Western Australia between Wubin and Muntadgin and spinescens is found in similar areas to subspecies coerulescens but only in Western Australia.

== Conservation ==
All three subspecies of C. coerulescens are classified as "not threatened" by the Western Australian Government Department of Parks and Wildlife.
