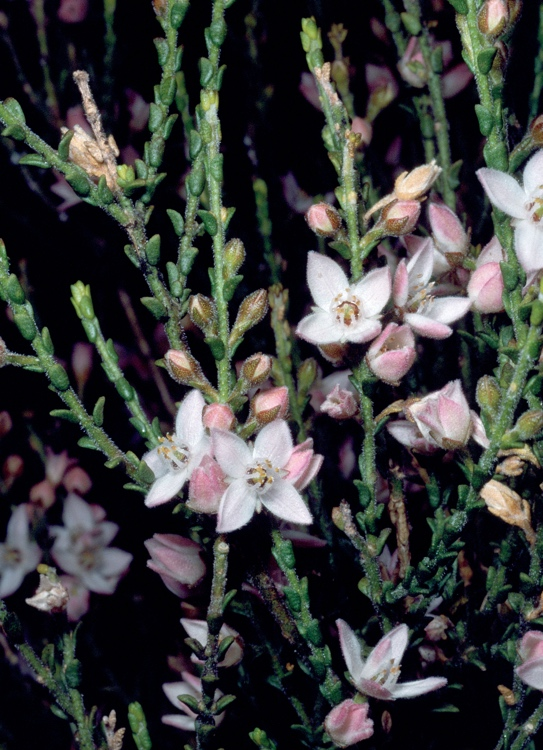
- Cyanothamnus baeckeaceus in the Australian National Botanic Gardens

Scientific classification
- Kingdom: Plantae
- Clade: Tracheophytes
- Clade: Angiosperms
- Clade: Eudicots
- Clade: Rosids
- Order: Sapindales
- Family: Rutaceae
- Genus: Cyanothamnus
- Species: C. baeckeaceus

Binomial name
- Cyanothamnus baeckeaceus (F.Muell.) Duretto & Heslewood
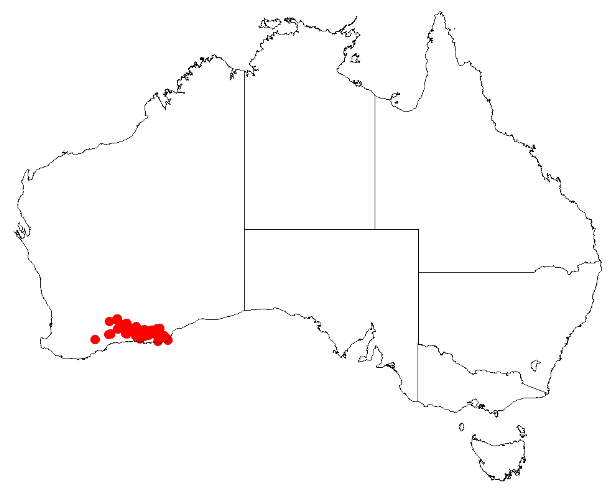
- Occurrence data from Australasian Virtual Herbarium

Synonyms
- Boronia baeckeacea F.Muell.

= Cyanothamnus baeckeaceus =

Narrow-leaved boronia

Species of flowering plant

Cyanothamnus baeckeaceus is a plant in the citrus family, Rutaceae and is endemic to eastern Australia. It is a slender or straggling shrub with simple or trifoliate leaves and pink and white four-petalled flowers. It is endemic to the south-west of Western Australia.

== Description ==
Cyanothamnus baeckeaceus is a slender or straggling shrub that grows to a height of 0.2–1 m (0.7–3 ft) with either simple leaves 2–7 mm (0.079–0.28 in) long or trifoliate leaves 4–7 mm (0.16–0.28 in) wide in outline. Pink and white flowers with four sepals and four petals appear between March and December.

== Taxonomy and naming ==
This species was first formally described in 1863 by Ferdinand von Mueller who gave it the name Boronia baeckeacea in Fragmenta phytographiae Australiae. Mueller did not give a reason for using the specific epithet (baeckeacea), but noted that the shrub has "a stature of [some species of] Baeckea.

In a 2013 paper in the journal Taxon, Marco Duretto and others changed the name to Cyanothamnus baeckeaceus on the basis of cladistic analysis.

Two subspecies were described by Paul G.Wilson in the journal Nuytsia and the names have subsequently been changed to reflect the change in the genus name:

- Cyanothamnus baeckeaceus subsp. baeckeaceus (the autonym) which has simple, erect, almost round leaves 2–3 mm (0.079–0.12 in) long and grows in a variety of situations between Pingrup and Mount Ragged in the Cape Arid National Park;
- Cyanothamnus baeckeaceus subsp. patulus which has more or less spreading, simple or trifoliate, broadly elliptic to egg-shaped leaves 4–7 mm (0.16–0.28 in) long and grows in mallee near Mount Ney and Mount Heywood north-east of Esperance.

== Conservation ==
Subspecies baeckeaceus is classed as "not threatened" by the Western Australian Government Department of Parks and Wildlife but subspecies patulus is classes as "Priority One" by the Government of Western Australia Department of Parks and Wildlife, meaning that it is known from only one or a few locations which are potentially at risk.
