= Cyanothamnus yarrowmerensis =

Scientific classification
- Kingdom: Plantae
- Clade: Tracheophytes
- Clade: Angiosperms
- Clade: Eudicots
- Clade: Rosids
- Order: Sapindales
- Family: Rutaceae
- Genus: Cyanothamnus
- Species: C. yarrowmerensis

Binomial name
- Cyanothamnus yarrowmerensis (Duretto) Duretto & Heslewood

Synonyms
- Boronia yarrowmerensis Duretto

Species of flowering plant

Cyanothamnus yarrowmerensis is a species of erect, woody shrub that is endemic to Queensland. It has pinnate or bipinnate leaves and groups of up to seven flowers with white petals in leaf axils.

== Description ==
Cyanothamnus yarrowmerensis is an erect, woody shrub that typically grows to a height of about 0.5 m (1 ft 8 in). It has pinnate or bipinnate leaves 21–35 mm (0.83–1.38 in) long and 24–44 mm (0.94–1.73 in) wide with between three and seven leaflets on a petiole 5.5–13 mm (0.22–0.51 in) long. The end leaflet is linear, 5–17 mm (0.20–0.67 in) long and about 1 mm (0.039 in) wide and the side leaflets are similar but longer. The flowers are white and are arranged in groups of up to seven in leaf axils on a peduncle about 1 mm (0.039 in) long. The sepals are circular, about 1 mm (0.039 in) long and wide and the petals are 2–2.5 mm (0.079–0.098 in) long. The stamens and the style are hairy and the stigma is minute, scarcely wider than the style. Flowering has been observed in October and the fruit is a glabrous capsule about 3 mm (0.12 in) long and 1.5 mm (0.059 in) wide.

== Taxonomy and naming ==
This species was first formally described in 2003 by Marco F. Duretto and given the name Boronia yarrowmerensis in the journal Muelleria from a specimen collected north of Yarrowmere Station homestead. In a 2013 paper in the journal Taxon, Marco Duretto and others changed the name to Cyanothamnus yarrowmerensis on the basis of cladistic analysis. The specific epithet (yarrowmerensis) refers to type location.

== Distribution and habitat ==
Cyanothamnus yarrowmerensis is only known from the type location in North Queensland where it grows in Eucalyptus forest or woodland on sandy soil .

== Conservation ==
Cyanothamnus yarrowmerensis (as Boronia yarrowmerensisis) is listed as of "least concern" by the Queensland Government Department of Environment and Science.
