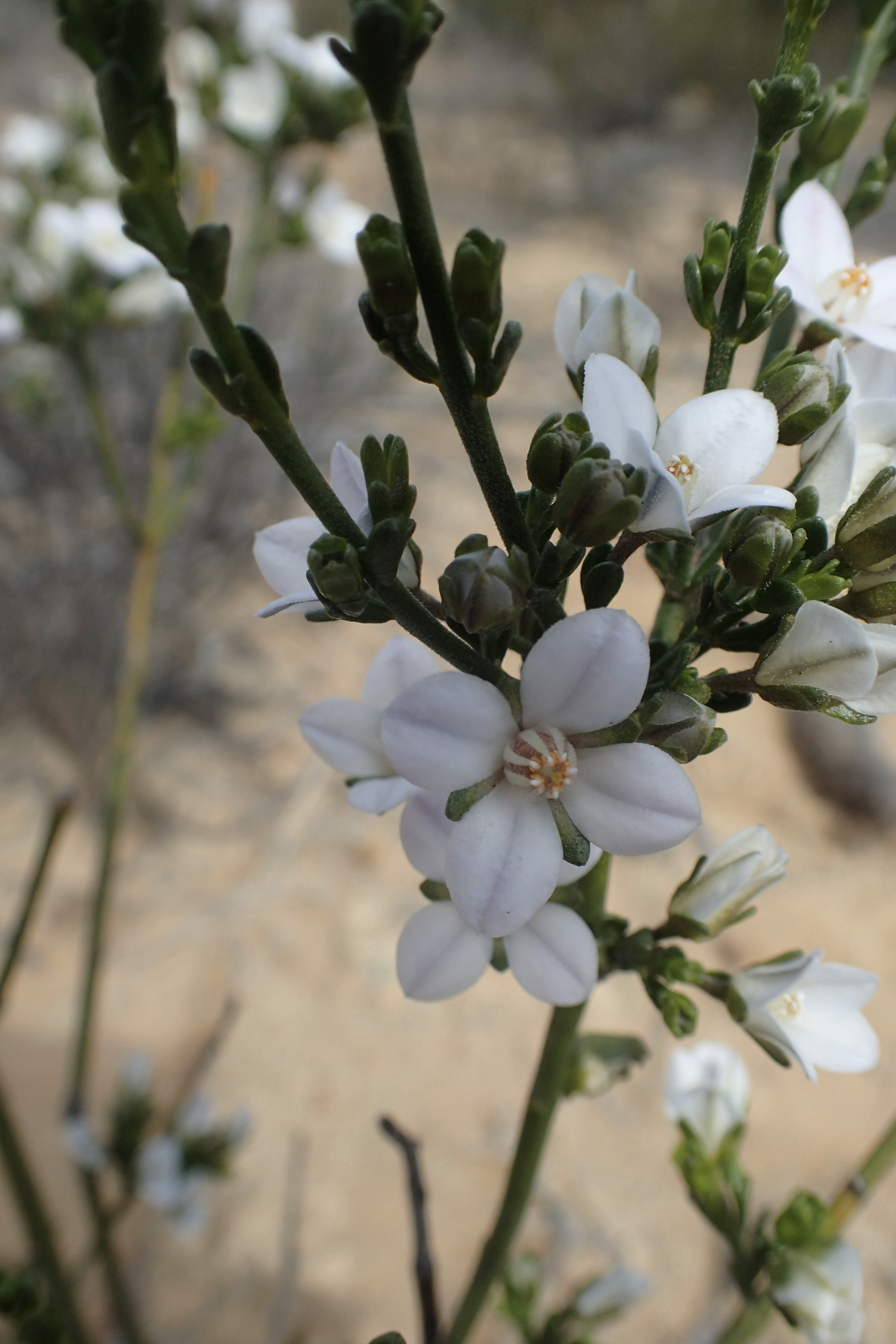

Scientific classification
- Kingdom: Plantae
- Clade: Tracheophytes
- Clade: Angiosperms
- Clade: Eudicots
- Clade: Rosids
- Order: Sapindales
- Family: Rutaceae
- Genus: Cyanothamnus
- Species: C. fabianoides

Binomial name
- Cyanothamnus fabianoides (Diels) Duretto & Heslewood
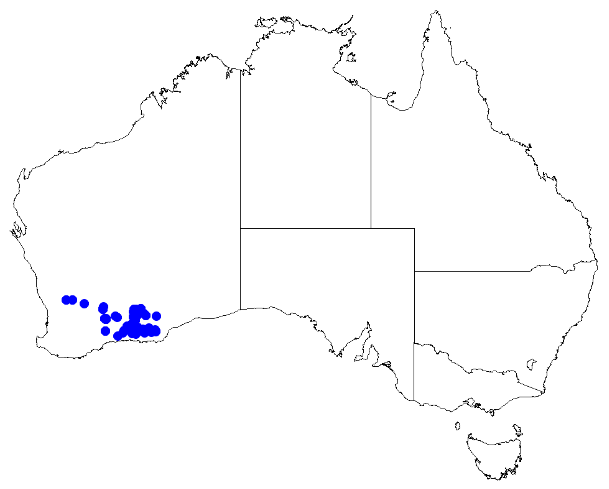
- Occurrence data from Australasian Virtual Herbarium

Synonyms
- Boronia fabianoides (Diels) Paul G.Wilson; Eriostemon fabianoides Diels

= Cyanothamnus fabianoides =

Species of flowering plant

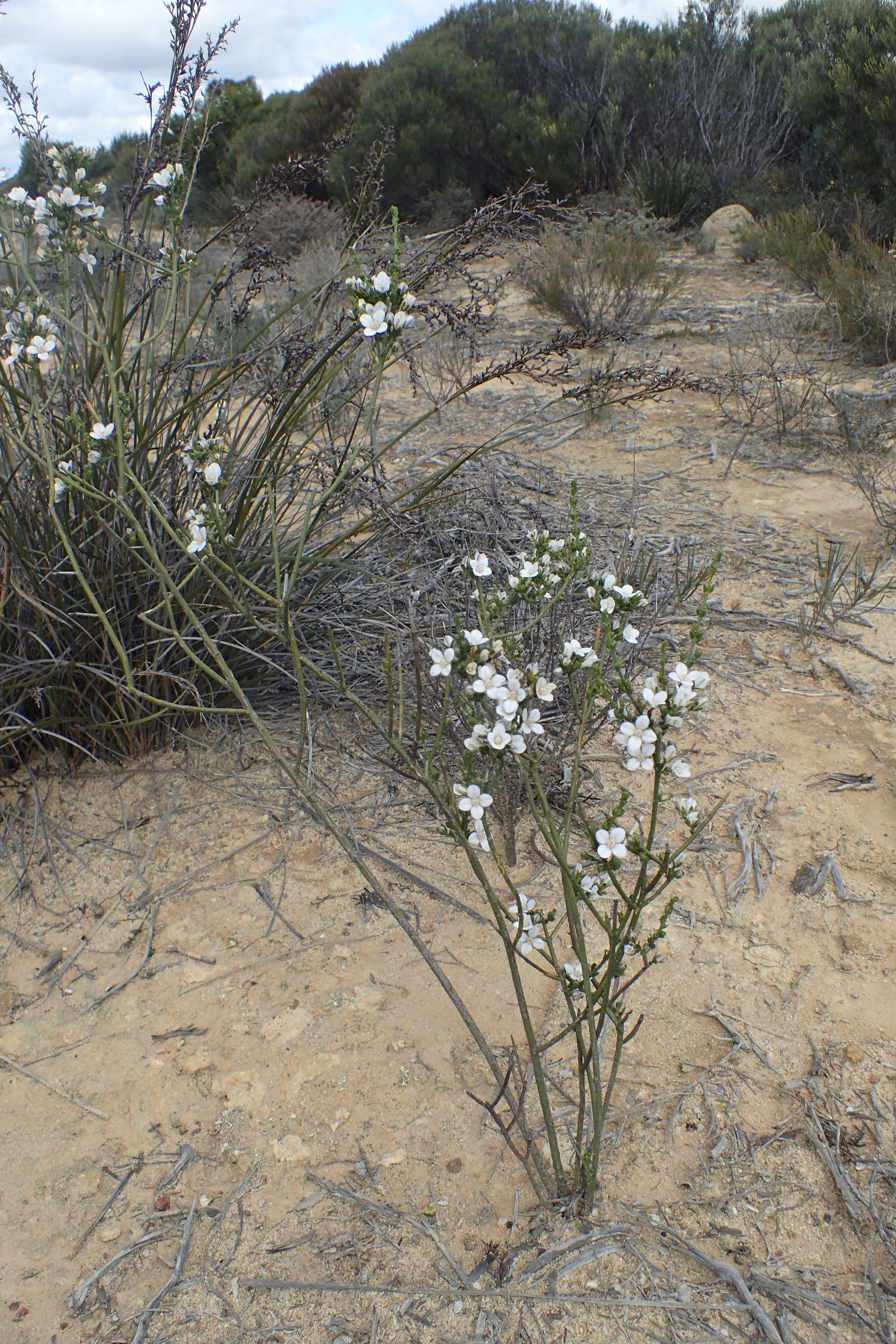
Habit near Lake Hurlstone Nature Reserve

Cyanothamnus fabianoides is a plant in the citrus family, Rutaceae and is endemic to the south-west of Western Australia. It is a compact shrub with many branches, simple, more or less cylindrical leaves and single white, pink or pale blue four-petalled flowers in the leaf axils.

== Description ==
Cyanothamnus fabianoides is a compact, multi-branched shrub that grows to a height of 0.3–0.6 m (1–2 ft). The leaves are simple, more or less cylindrical 5–15 mm (0.2–0.6 in) long with a channel on the upper surface and often bunched. The flowers are white, pink or pale blue and are borne singly in leaf axils on a fleshy pedicel 1–2 mm (0.04–0.08 in) long. The four sepals are fleshy, narrow triangular to egg-shaped and 1–3 mm (0.039–0.12 in) long. The four petals are broadly elliptic, 3–7 mm (0.1–0.3 in) long and thickened- glandular along the mid-line. The eight stamens are hairy.

== Taxonomy and naming ==
In 1904, Ludwig Diels described Eriostemon fabianoides in Botanische Jahrbücher für Systematik, Pflanzengeschichte und Pflanzengeographie from specimens collected near Grass Patch, Western Australia. In 2013, Marco Duretto, Margaret Heslewood and Michael Bayly changed the name to Cyanothamnus fabianoides on the basis of cladistic analysis. In a 2013 paper in the journal Taxon, Marco Duretto and others changed the name to Cyanothamnus fabianoides on the basis of cladistic analysis. The specific epithet (fabianoides) means "similar to a species of Fabiana".

In 1998 Paul G. Wilson had described two subspecies. The names have subsequently been changed to reflect the change in the genus name:

- Cyanothamnus fabianoides subsp. fabianoides (the autonym) grows to a height 0.1–0.3 m (0.3–1 ft) and has white petals 3 mm (0.1 in) long with a green midrib;
- Cyanothamnus fabianoides subsp. roseus grows to a height of about 0.3 m (1 ft) and has white petals with a pink midrib.

== Distribution and habitat ==
Subspecies fabianoides grows in eucalypt woodland between Norseman and the Esperance area but subspecies rosea grows on hillslopes, around granite rocks and undulating plains between Lake King and the Fraser Range east of Norseman.

== Conservation ==
Both subspecies of C. fabianoides are classified as 'not threatened' by the Western Australian Government Department of Biodiversity, Conservation and Attractions.
