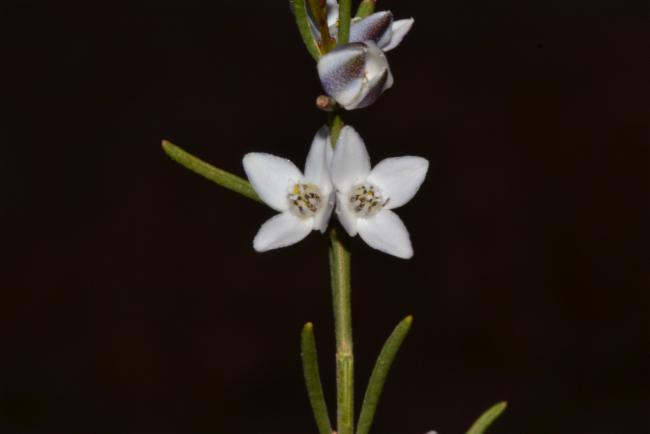

Scientific classification
- Kingdom: Plantae
- Clade: Tracheophytes
- Clade: Angiosperms
- Clade: Eudicots
- Clade: Rosids
- Order: Sapindales
- Family: Rutaceae
- Genus: Cyanothamnus
- Species: C. subsessilis

Binomial name
- Cyanothamnus subsessilis (Benth.) Duretto & Heslewood
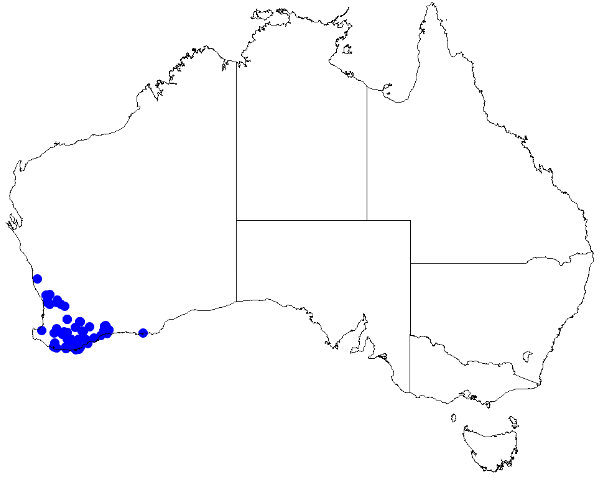
- Occurrence data from Australasian Virtual Herbarium

Synonyms
- Boronia subsessilis Benth.

= Cyanothamnus subsessilis =

Species of flowering plant

Cyanothamnus subsessilis is a species of plant in the citrus family, Rutaceae and is endemic to the south-west of Western Australia. It is a woody, mostly glabrous shrub with simple leaves and flowers with four petals that are white on the front and green to blue on the back.

== Description ==
Cyanothamnus subsessilis is a woody shrub that grows to a height of 10–40 cm (4–20 in) and is glabrous apart from the stamens. The leaves are simple and sessile, narrow cylindrical 10–25 mm (0.39–0.98 in) long. The flowers are borne singly or in pairs in leaf axils on a pedicel 1–3 mm (0.04–0.1 in) long. The four sepals are thick, broadly egg-shaped and about 2 mm (0.079 in) long. The four petals are white on the front, green to blue on the back, broadly egg-shaped and about 6 mm (0.24 in) long. The eight stamens are flat and hairy and there is a broadly egg-shaped appendage on the anthers. Flowering occurs from May to September.

== Taxonomy and naming ==
This species was first formally described in 1863 by George Bentham and given the name Boronia subsessilis in Flora Australiensis from a specimen collected by James Drummond. In a 2013 paper in the journal Taxon, Marco Duretto and others changed the name to Cyanothamnus subsessilis on the basis of cladistic analysis. The specific epithet (subsessilis) is derived from the Latin word sessilis meaning "sitting" with the prefix "sub-" meaning "under", "from", "somewhat" or "less than".

== Distribution and habitat ==
Cyanothamnus subsessilis grows on rocky hills and in sand between Toodyay, Denmark and Ravensthorpe.

== Conservation ==
Cyanothamnus subsessilis is classified as "not threatened" by the Western Australian Government Department of Parks and Wildlife.
