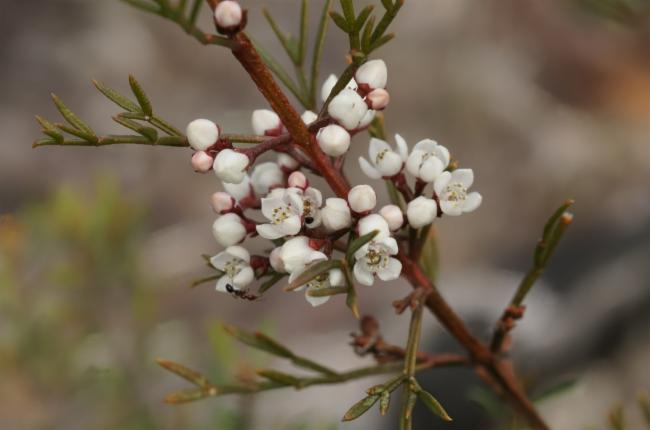
- Cyanothamnus occidentalis near Baradine

Scientific classification
- Kingdom: Plantae
- Clade: Tracheophytes
- Clade: Angiosperms
- Clade: Eudicots
- Clade: Rosids
- Order: Sapindales
- Family: Rutaceae
- Genus: Cyanothamnus
- Species: C. occidentalis

Binomial name
- Cyanothamnus occidentalis (Duretto) Duretto & Heslewood
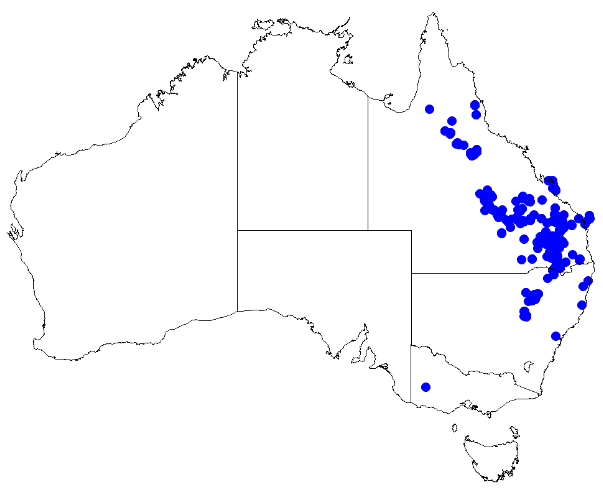
- Occurrence data from Australasian Virtual Herbarium

Synonyms
- Boronia occidentalis Duretto

= Cyanothamnus occidentalis =

Rock boronia

Species of flowering plant

Cyanothamnus occidentalis, commonly known as the rock boronia, is a plant in the citrus family Rutaceae and is endemic to eastern Australia. It is an erect, woody shrub with pinnate or bipinnate leaves and groups of up to three white to pale pink, pink four-petalled flowers arranged in leaf axils.

== Description ==
Cyanothamnus occidentalis is an erect, woody shrub that grows to a height of about 1 m (3 ft). It has pinnate or bipinnate leaves with between three and seven leaflets. The leaf is 9–25 mm (0.4–1 in) long and 7–25 mm (0.3–1 in) wide in outlines, on a petiole 3–7 mm (0.1–0.3 in). The end leaflet 1–4 mm (0.04–0.2 in) long and 0.5–1 mm (0.02–0.04 in) wide and the side leaflets are similar but longer. The flowers are white to pale pink and are arranged singly or in groups of up to three in leaf axils on a peduncle 0.5–2 mm (0.02–0.08 in) long. The four sepals are triangular, 1–2.5 mm (0.04–0.1 in) long and 0.5–2 mm (0.02–0.08 in) wide. The four petals are 2–3 mm (0.08–0.1 in) long. The eight stamens are hairy on their edges and the stigma is tiny, no wider than the style. Flowering mainly occurs from July to January and the fruit is a capsule 2–2.5 mm (0.08–0.1 in) long and about 1.5 mm (0.06 in) wide with the petals remaining.

== Taxonomy and naming ==
This species was first formally described in 2003 by Marco F. Duretto who gave it the name Boronia occidentalis from a specimen collected in the Wondul Range National Park and the description was published in Muelleria. In a 2013 paper in the journal Taxon, Marco Duretto and others changed the name to Cyanothamnus occidentalis on the basis of cladistic analysis. The specific epithet (occidentalis) is a Latin word meaning "western", alluding to the fact that in most places, this species has a more westerly distribution than that of other boronias.

== Distribution and habitat ==
The rock boronia is one of the most widespread boronias and is found between Mount Sturgeon near Hughenden in north Queensland and Dubbo in New South Wales. It mostly grows in woodland on sandstone or in sandy soil.

== Conservation ==
Cyanothamnus occidentalis (as Boronia occidentalis) is listed as of "least concern" by the Queensland Government Department of Environment and Science.
