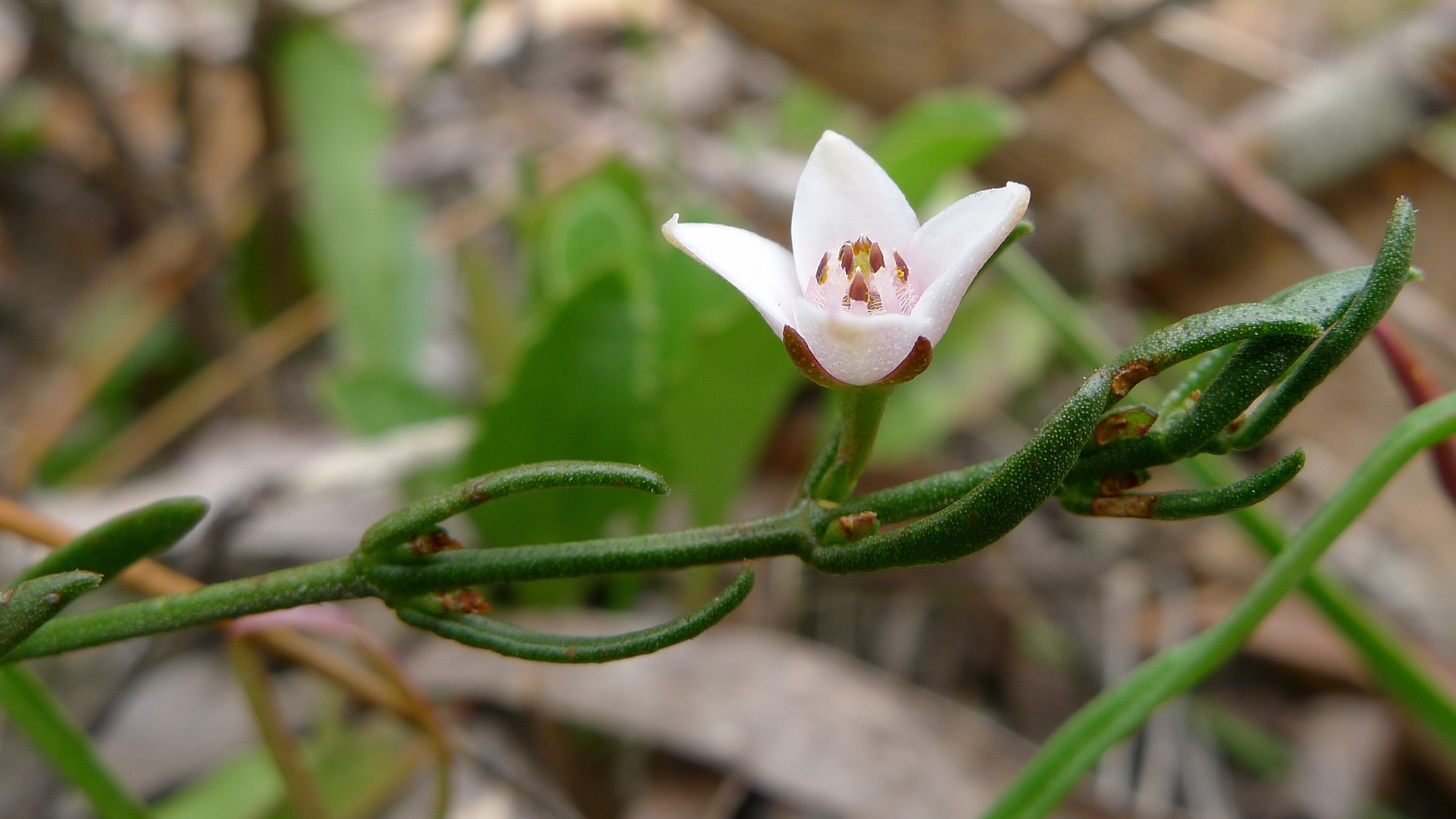
- Cyanothamnus nanus var. hyssopifolius in Morton National Park

Scientific classification
- Kingdom: Plantae
- Clade: Tracheophytes
- Clade: Angiosperms
- Clade: Eudicots
- Clade: Rosids
- Order: Sapindales
- Family: Rutaceae
- Genus: Cyanothamnus
- Species: C. nanus

Binomial name
- Cyanothamnus nanus (Hook.) Duretto & Heslewood
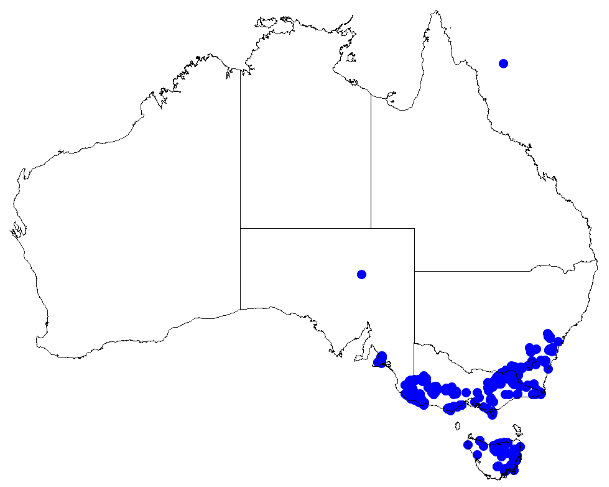
- Occurrence data from Australasian Virtual Herbarium

Synonyms
- Boronia nana Hook.; Boronia polygalifolia var. trifoliolata Benth.

= Cyanothamnus nanus =

Dwarf boronia

Species of plant

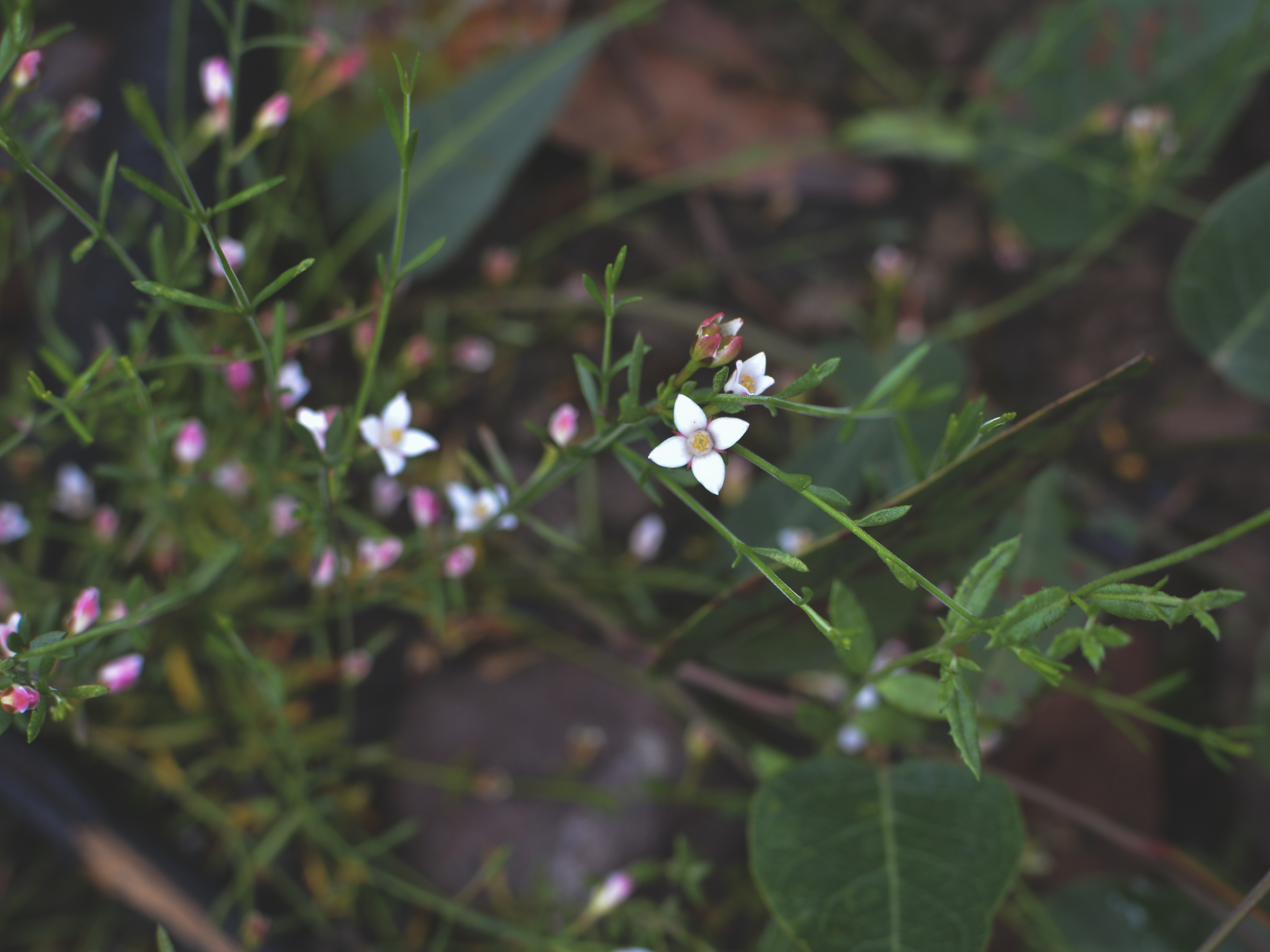
Cyanothamnus nanus var. hyssopifolius photographed in Kosciuszko National Park

Cyanothamnus nanus, commonly known as the dwarf boronia or small boronia is a plant in the citrus family Rutaceae and is endemic to eastern Australia. It is a prostrate or low spreading shrub with simple or three-part leaves and white or pale pink four-petalled flowers.

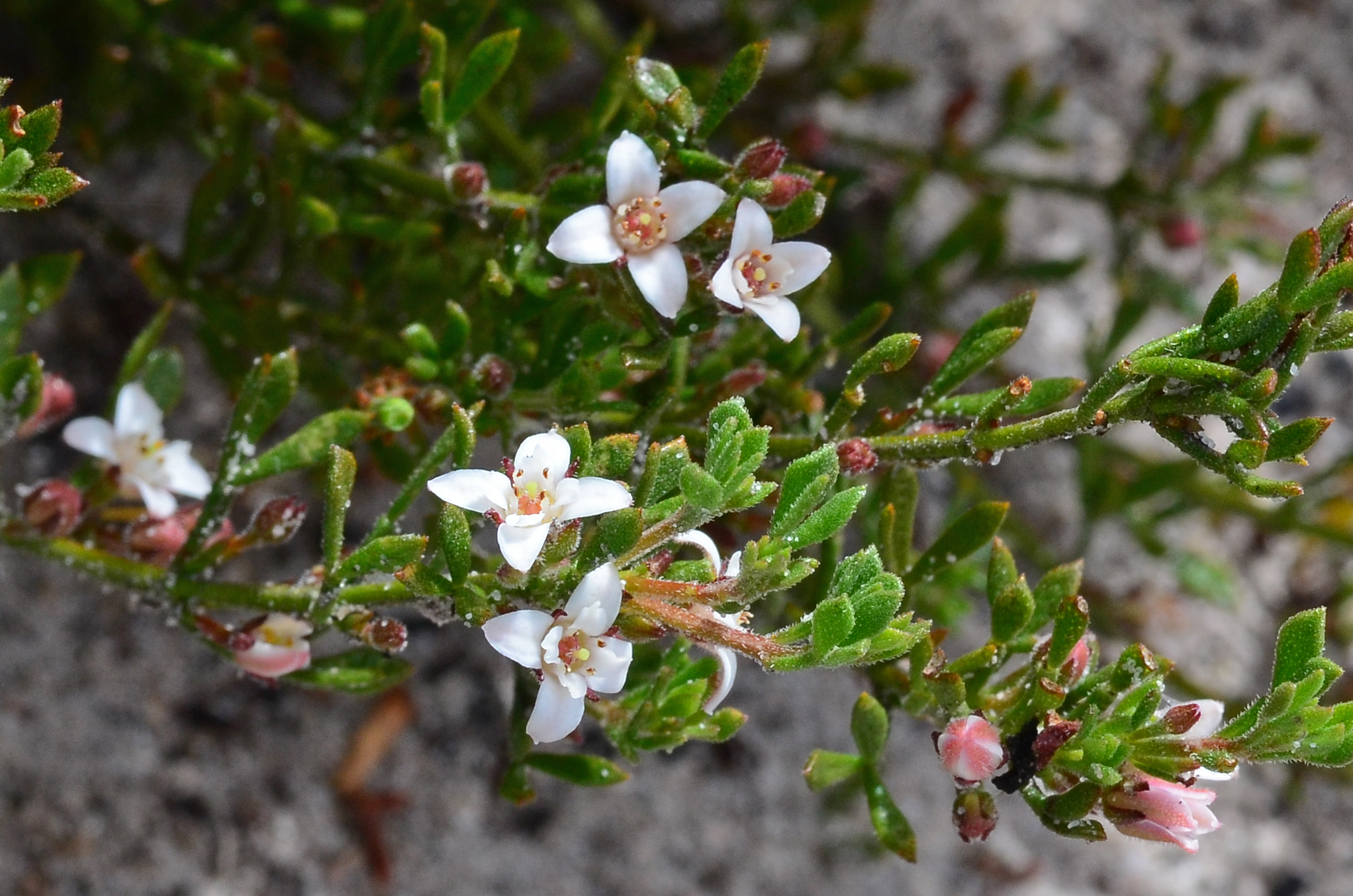
Cyanothamnus nana var. pubescens

== Description ==
Cyanothamnus nanus is a prostrate shrub or one that has weak, spreading branches and grows to about 25 cm (10 in) wide and 50 cm (20 in) high. Its youngest branches have a few soft hairs but become glabrous as they age. The leaves are simple or trifoliate on a petiole up to 5 mm (0.2 in) long. The leaves or leaflets are linear to elliptic or egg-shaped, 2–15 mm (0.08–0.6 in) long and 0.5–3.5 mm (0.02–0.1 in) wide. The flowers are white to pale pink and are arranged singly or in groups of up to three or more in leaf axils, the groups on a peduncle 1–7 mm (0.04–0.3 in) long, individual flowers on a pedicel 2–16 mm (0.08–0.6 in). The four sepals are triangular to broadly egg-shaped, 1–3.5 mm (0.04–0.1 in) long and 0.5–1.5 mm (0.02–0.06 in) wide, overlapping at their bases. The four petals are 3–5.5 mm (0.1–0.2 in) long, 1.2–3 mm (0.05–0.1 in) wide and overlap at their bases. The stamens are covered with long, soft hairs. Flowering occurs from October to February.

== Taxonomy and naming ==
Dwarf boronia was first formally described in 1840 by William Jackson Hooker who gave it the name Boronia nana in Icones Plantarum from a specimen collected by Ronald Campbell Gunn on top of Rocky Cape. In a 2013 paper in the journal Taxon, Marco Duretto and others changed the name to Cyanothamnus nanus on the basis of cladistic analysis.

The names of three varieties have been accepted by Plants of the World Online:

- Cyanothamnus nanus var. hyssopifolius has simple leaves;
- Cyanothamnus nanus var. nanus (the autonym) has mostly trifoliate leaves, mostly glabrous leaves, sepals and petals;
- Cyanothamnus nanus var. pubescens has mostly trifoliate leaves with short, soft hairs.

== Distribution and habitat ==
- Cyanothamnus nanus var. hyssopifolius grows in woodland, forest and heath and is the only variety of B. nana in New South Wales where it is found south from the Blue Mountains, but also occurs in central and eastern areas of Victoria, the far southeast corner of South Australia and the eastern half of Tasmania;
- Cyanothamnus nanus var. nanus grows in heath and heathy woodland, and occurs mostly in the south-west of Victoria and in the far south-east of South Australia;
- Cyanothamnus nanus var. pubescens grows in rocky soils in open forest, woodland and heath and mainly occurs between the Grampians and Lexton in Victoria and in the far south-east of South Australia.
