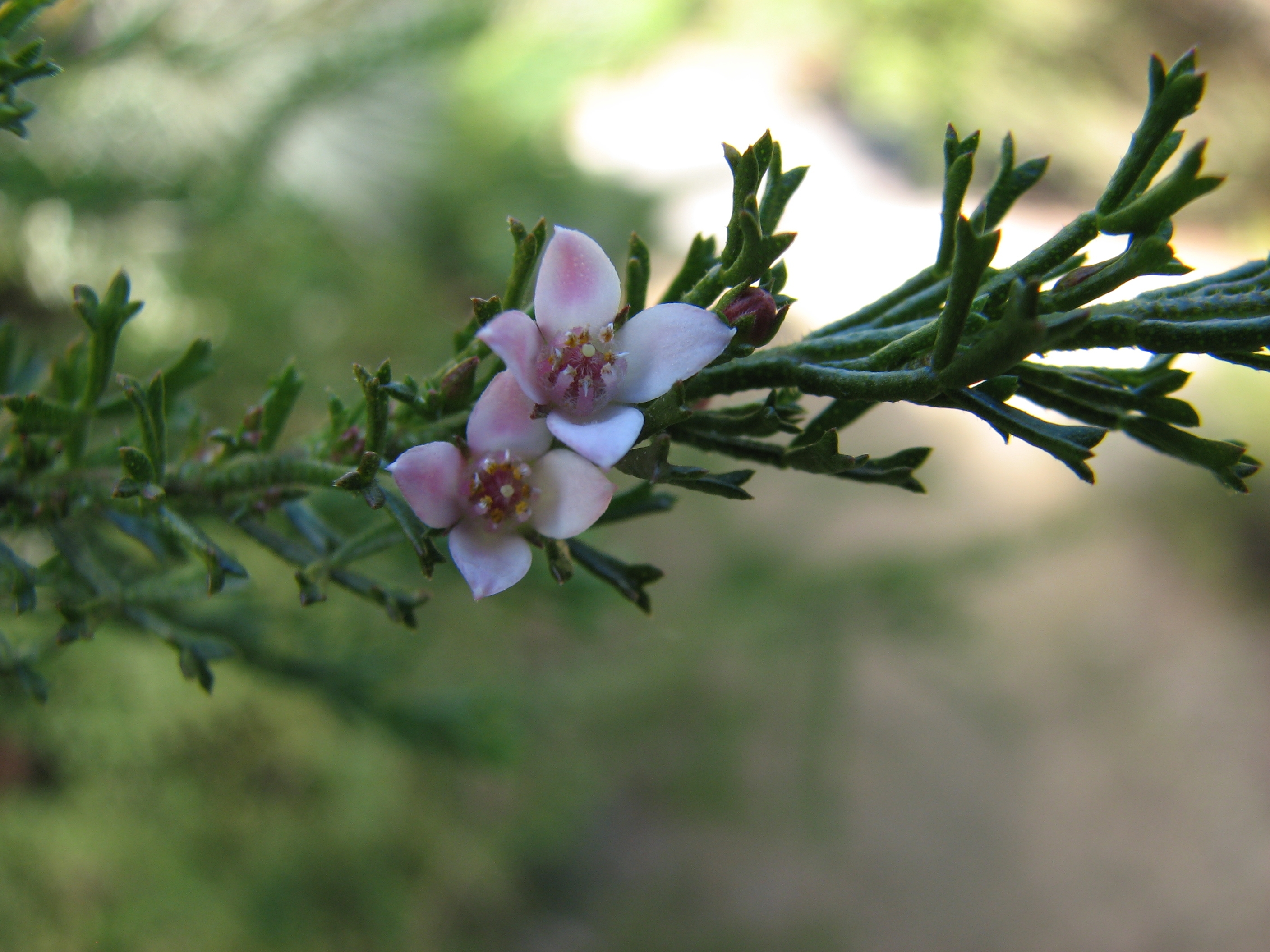
- Cyanothamnus anemonifolius

Scientific classification
- Kingdom: Plantae
- Clade: Tracheophytes
- Clade: Angiosperms
- Clade: Eudicots
- Clade: Rosids
- Order: Sapindales
- Family: Rutaceae
- Subfamily: Zanthoxyloideae
- Genus: Cyanothamnus; Lindl.

Species
- See text.

= Cyanothamnus =

Genus of plants

Cyanothamnus is a genus of flowering plant in the family Rutaceae, native to Australia. Plants in the genus Cyanothamnus are erect or spreading shrubs usually with pinnate leaves (simple leaves in C. anemonifolius and C. nanus) arranged in opposite pairs, the leaves or leaflets flat. The flowers are arranged singly or in cymes with minute bracts. The petals are usually pink or white, sometimes blue or yellowish-green.

== Taxonomy ==
The genus was first described in 1839 by John Lindley in A Sketch of the Vegetation of the Swan River Colony. Most of the species now placed in the genus were first described in the genus Boronia, with which Cyanothamnus was synonymized. A molecular phylogenetic study in 2020 showed that as then circumscribed Boronia was polyphyletic, and Lindley's genus was revived. A 2021 classification of the family Rutaceae places Cyanothamnus in the subfamily Zanthoxyloideae.

=== Species ===
As of September 2021, Plants of the World Online accepted the following species:

- Cyanothamnus acanthocladus (Paul G.Wilson) Duretto & Heslewood (W.A.)
- Cyanothamnus anemonifolius (A.Cunn.) Duretto & Heslewood – narrow-leaved boronia, sticky boronia (Qld., N.S.W., Vic., Tas.)
- Cyanothamnus baeckeaceus (F.Muell.) Duretto & Heslewood (W.A.)
- Cyanothamnus bipinnatus (Lindl.) Duretto & Heslewood – rock boronia (Qld.)
- Cyanothamnus bussellianus (F.Muell.) Duretto & Heslewood (W.A.)
- Cyanothamnus coerulescens (F.Muell.) Duretto & Heslewood – blue boronia (N.S.W., Vic., S.A., W.A.)
- Cyanothamnus defoliatus (F.Muell.) Duretto & Heslewood (W.A.)
- Cyanothamnus fabianoides (Diels) Duretto & Heslewood (W.A.)
- Cyanothamnus inconspicuus (Benth.) Duretto & Heslewood (W.A.)
- Cyanothamnus inflexus (Duretto) Duretto & Heslewood (Qld., N.S.W.)
- Cyanothamnus montimulliganensis (Duretto) Duretto & Heslewood (Qld.)
- Cyanothamnus nanus (Hook.) Duretto & Heslewood – dwarf boronia, small boronia (N.S.W., Vic., Tas., S.A.)
- Cyanothamnus occidentalis (Duretto) Duretto & Heslewood – rock boronia (Qld., N.S.W.)
- Cyanothamnus penicillatus (Benth.) Duretto & Heslewood (W.A.)
- Cyanothamnus polygalifolius (Sm.) Duretto & Heslewood – dwarf boronia, milkwort-leaved boronia, milkwort boronia (Qld., N.S.W.)
- Cyanothamnus quadrangulus Duretto & Heslewood – narrow-leaved boronia (Qld., N.S.W.)
- Cyanothamnus ramosus Lindl. (W.A.)
- Cyanothamnus rigens (Cheel) Duretto & Heslewood – stiff boronia (N.S.W.)
- Cyanothamnus subsessilis (Benth.) Duretto & Heslewood (W.A.)
- Cyanothamnus tenuis Lindl. – blue boronia (W.A.)
- Cyanothamnus warangensis (Duretto) Duretto & Heslewood (Qld.)
- Cyanothamnus westringioides (Paul G.Wilson) Duretto & Heslewood (W.A.)
- Cyanothamnus yarrowmerensis (Duretto) Duretto & Heslewood (Qld.)
