= Margaret M. Heslewood =

Australian botanist

- Known for: Botany
- Scientific career
- Author abbrev. (botany): Heslewood

Margaret Mary Heslewood is an Australian botanist. Working at the National Herbarium of New South Wales, she focuses on bryophytes, in particular the taxonomy of liverworts.

In partnership with Marco F. Duretto, she has researched and described 21 of the 23 accepted species of Cyanothamnus.

The standard author abbreviation Heslewood is used to indicate this person as the author when citing a botanical name.
