= Taxon (journal) =

- Discipline: Plant taxonomy
- Language: English
- Edited by: Dirk C. Albach

Publication details
- History: 1952–present
- Publisher: Wiley on behalf of the International Association for Plant Taxonomy
- Frequency: Bimonthly
- Open access: Hybrid
- Impact factor: 2.680 (2020)

Standard abbreviations
- ISO 4: Taxon

Indexing
- CODEN: TAXNAP
- ISSN: 0040-0262 (print); 1996-8175 (web)
- LCCN: sf81002028
- JSTOR: 00400262
- OCLC no.: 693163107

Links
- Journal homepage; Online access; Online archive

Taxon is a bimonthly peer-reviewed scientific journal covering plant taxonomy. It is published by Wiley on behalf of the International Association for Plant Taxonomy, of which it is the official journal. It was established in 1952 and is the only place where nomenclature proposals and motions to amend the International Code of Nomenclature for algae, fungi, and plants (except for the rules concerning fungi) can be published. The editor-in-chief is Dirk C. Albach (University of Oldenburg).

== Abstracting and indexing ==
The journal is abstracted and indexed in:

- Aquatic Sciences and Fisheries Abstracts
- Biological Abstracts
- BIOSIS Previews
- CAB Abstracts
- Chemical Abstracts Service
- Current Contents/Agriculture, Biology & Environmental Sciences
- GEOBASE
- Science Citation Index Expanded
- Scopus
- The Zoological Record

According to the Journal Citation Reports, the journal has a 2020 impact factor of 2.817.
