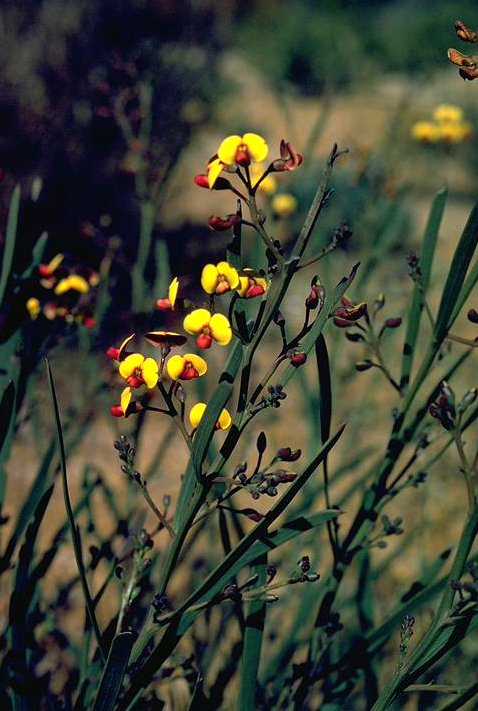
- Near Bindoon

Scientific classification
- Kingdom: Plantae
- Clade: Tracheophytes
- Clade: Angiosperms
- Clade: Eudicots
- Clade: Rosids
- Order: Fabales
- Family: Fabaceae
- Subfamily: Faboideae
- Genus: Daviesia
- Species: D. longifolia

Binomial name
- Daviesia longifolia Benth.

= Daviesia longifolia =

Species of flowering plant

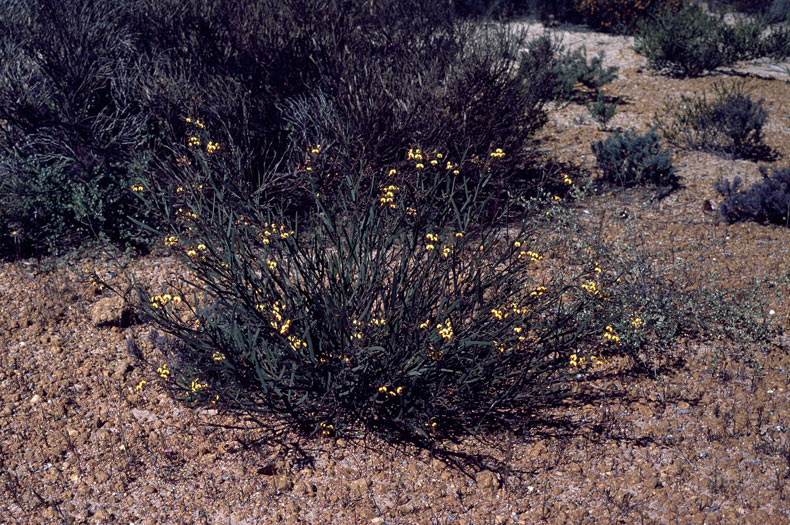
Habit

Daviesia longifolia is a species of flowering plant in the family Fabaceae and is endemic to the south-west of Western Australia. It is an erect, many-stemmed shrub with scattered, erect, cylindrical phyllodes and yellow and red flowers.

== Description ==
Daviesia longifolia is a bushy, many-stemmed shrub, typically 30–70 cm (12–28 in) high and about 1–3 m (3 ft 3 in – 9 ft 10 in) wide with weak, tangled branchlets. Its phyllodes are scattered, erect, cylindrical, snaking or curved, up to 250 mm (9.8 in) long and 1–10 mm (0.039–0.394 in) wide with six or more parallel ribs. The flowers are arranged in racemes of four to fifteen in leaf axils on a peduncle usually 10–17 mm (0.39–0.67 in) long, the rachis mostly 6–28 mm (0.24–1.10 in) long. The sepals are 3–4 mm (0.12–0.16 in) long and joined at the base, the upper two lobes joined for most of their length and the lower three about 0.5 mm (0.020 in) long. The standard petal is egg-shaped with a notch at the tip, 6.5–9 mm (0.26–0.35 in) long, yellow and dark red with an oblong yellow mark at the centre. The wings are 6.5–8 mm (0.26–0.31 in) long and dark red, and the keel 4.5–6.0 mm (0.18–0.24 in) long and deep red. Flowering occurs between August and December and the fruit is a flattened triangular pod 7–12 mm (0.28–0.47 in) long.

== Taxonomy and naming ==
Daviesia longifolia was first formally described in 1839 by George Bentham in John Lindley's A Sketch of the Vegetation of the Swan River Colony. The specific epithet (longifolia) means "long-leaved".

== Distribution and habitat ==
This daviesia usually grows in heath between Eneabba, the Blackwood River and Tarin Rock in the Avon Wheatbelt, Geraldton Sandplains, Jarrah Forest, Mallee and Swan Coastal Plain biogeographic regions of south-western Western Australia.

== Conservation status ==
Daviesia longifolia is listed as "not threatened" by the Government of Western Australia Department of Biodiversity, Conservation and Attractions.
