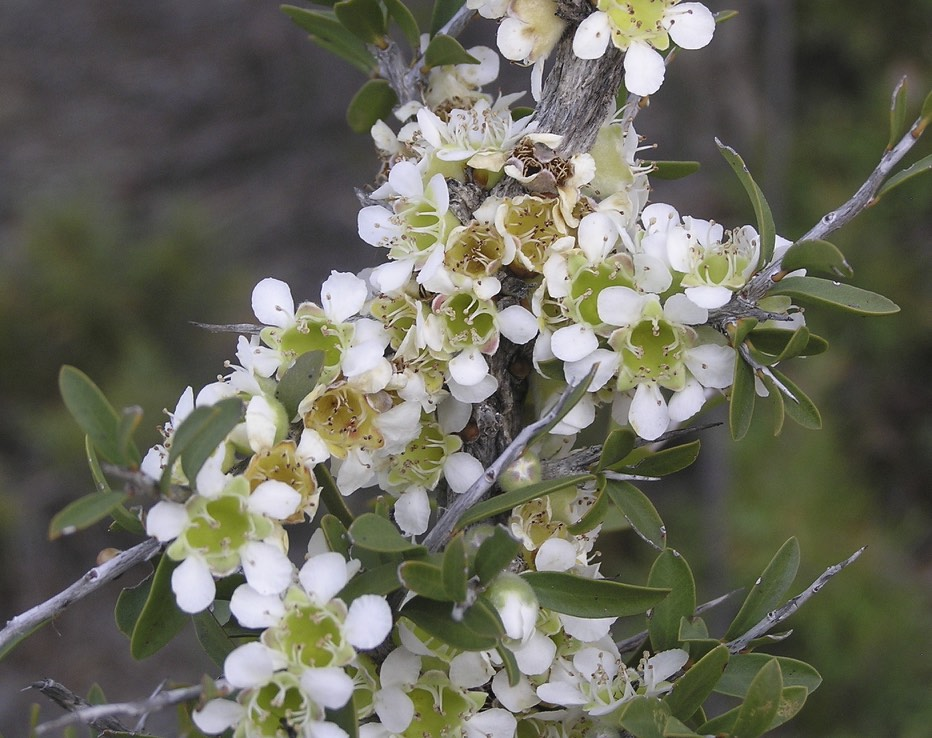
- At Tarin Rock

Scientific classification
- Kingdom: Plantae
- Clade: Tracheophytes
- Clade: Angiosperms
- Clade: Eudicots
- Clade: Rosids
- Order: Myrtales
- Family: Myrtaceae
- Genus: Apectospermum
- Species: A. spinescens

Binomial name
- Apectospermum spinescens (Endl.) Peter G.Wilson

Synonyms
- Leptospermum spinescens Endl.

= Apectospermum spinescens =

Spiny tea tree

Species of shrub

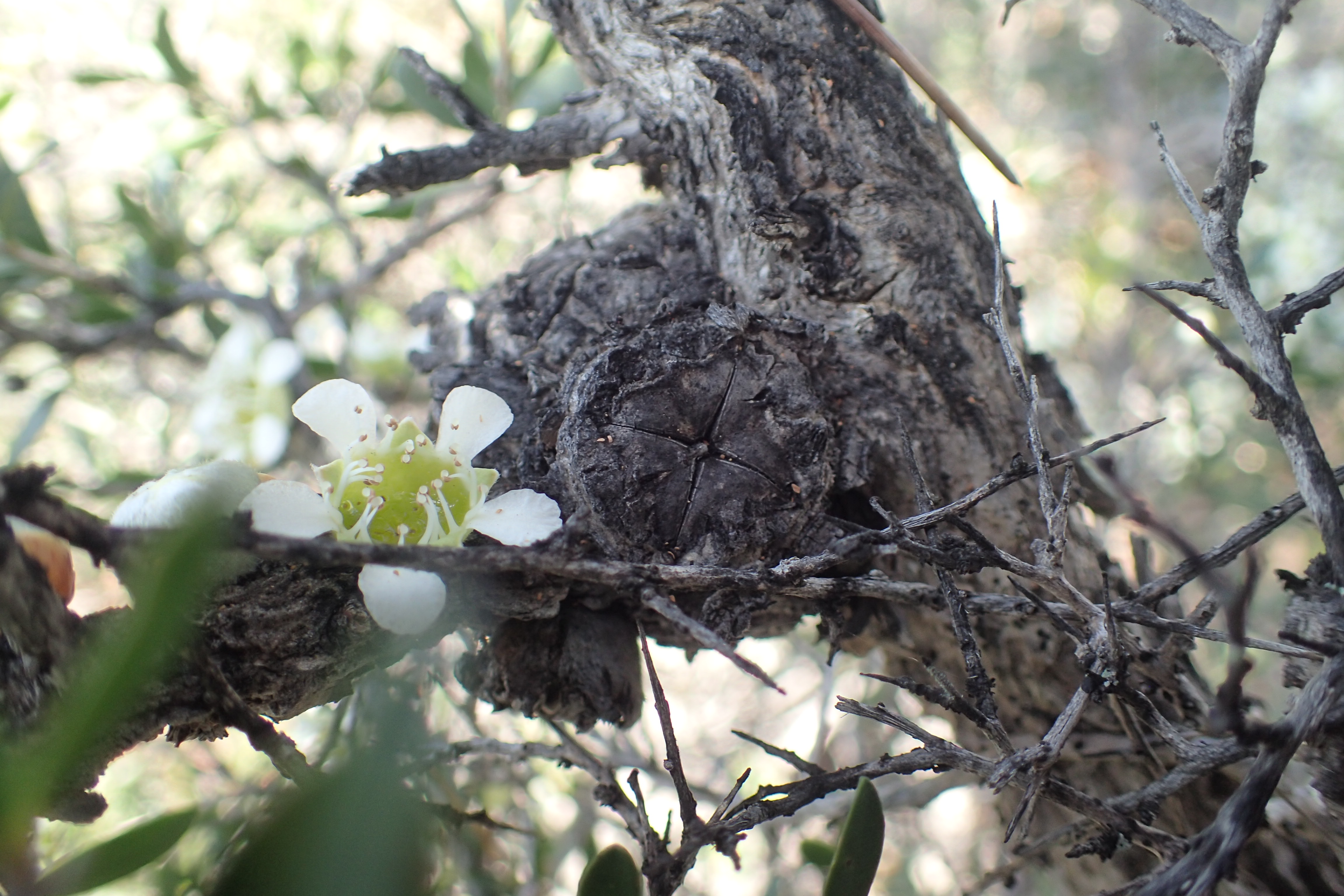
Fruit

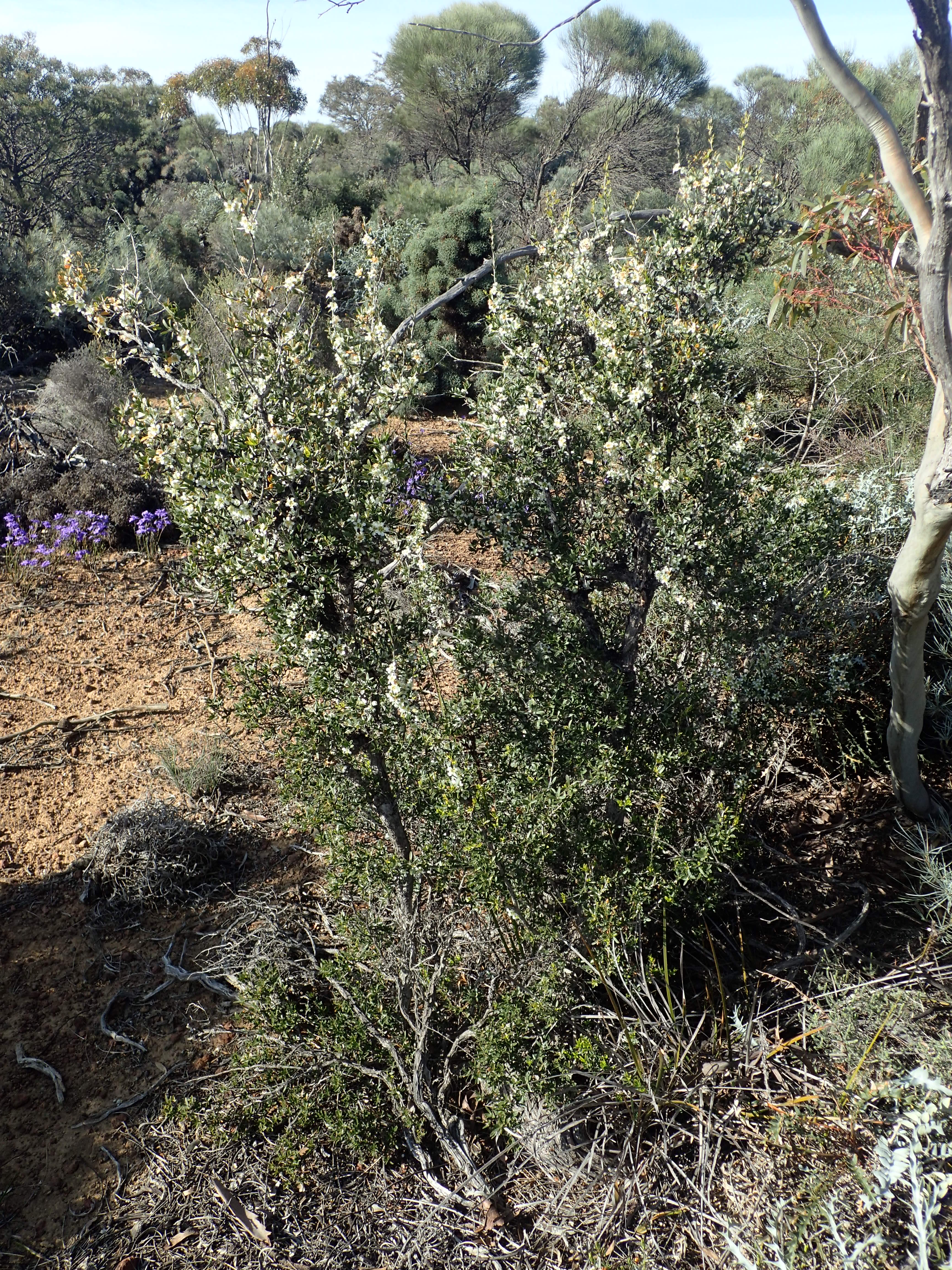
Habit in the Tarin Rock Nature Reserve

Apectospermum spinescens, commonly known as the spiny tea tree, is a species of spiny shrub that is endemic to Western Australia. It has thick, egg-shaped to elliptical leaves on a short petiole, white or greenish cream flowers, and fruit that remain in the plant for years after reaching maturity.

== Description ==
Leptospermum spinescens is a spiny shrub that typically grows to a height of 0.3–1.5 m (1 ft 0 in – 4 ft 11 in). It has firm but soft, brown, corky, corrugated bark, the younger stems thick, cylindrical and sharply-pointed with conspicuous leaf scars. The leaves are bright green, thick, egg-shaped to elliptical with the narrower end towards the base and mostly 5–15 mm (0.20–0.59 in) long an 2–5 mm (0.079–0.197 in) wide, tapering to a short petiole. The flowers are white, creamy white or greenish cream with a green centre, 10–15 mm (0.39–0.59 in) wide and arranged singly in leaf axils or near leaf scars on old wood. There are large, reddish brown, more or less round bracteoles at the base of the flower bud but which fall off before the flower opens. The floral cup is densely silky-hairy, about 5–8 mm (0.20–0.31 in) long and the sepals are hemispherical, about 2 mm (0.079 in) long with pale, thin edges. The petals are 3–6 mm (0.12–0.24 in) long and the stamens 2.5–4 mm (0.098–0.157 in) long. Flowering mainly occurs from September to December and the fruit is a capsule 20 mm (0.79 in) or more wide and remains on the plant for many years, often becoming partly buried in the bark.

== Taxonomy and naming ==
This species was first formally described in April 1837 by Stephan Endlicher who gave it the name Leptospermum spinescens and published the description in Enumeratio plantarum quas in Novae Hollandiae ora austro-occidentali ad fluvium Cygnorum et in Sinu Regis Georgii collegit Carolus liber baro de Hügel from specimens collected by Charles von Hügel near King Georges Sound. In 2023, Peter Gordon Wilson transferred the species to the genus Apectospermum as A. spinescens in the journal Taxon.

== Distribution and habitat ==
Spiny tea tree is found in kwongan or shrubland on hills and sand plains in the Wheatbelt, Great Southern, and southern Goldfields-Esperance regions of Western Australia, where it grows in sandy and lateritic soils.
