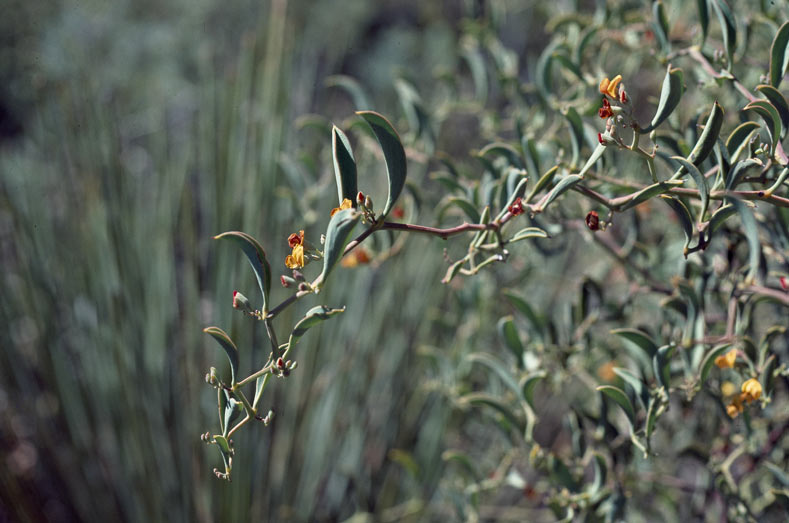
- Near Tarin Rock

Conservation status
- Priority Three — Poorly Known Taxa (DEC)

Scientific classification
- Kingdom: Plantae
- Clade: Tracheophytes
- Clade: Angiosperms
- Clade: Eudicots
- Clade: Rosids
- Order: Fabales
- Family: Fabaceae
- Subfamily: Faboideae
- Genus: Daviesia
- Species: D. tortuosa

Binomial name
- Daviesia tortuosa Crisp

= Daviesia tortuosa =

Species of legume

Daviesia tortuosa is a species of flowering plant in the family Fabaceae and is endemic to the south-west of Western Australia. It is a spreading, glabrous shrub with tangled, zigzagging branchlets, sharply-pointed, narrowly elliptic phyllodes, and yellow flowers with faint orange markings.

== Description ==
Daviesia tortuosa is a spreading, glabrous and glaucous shrub that typically grows up to 1 m (3 ft 3 in) high, 2 m (6 ft 7 in) wide and has many tangled, wiry, zigzagging branchlets. Its phyllodes are scattered, narrowly elliptic to narrowly egg-shaped with the narrower end towards the base, 10–35 mm (0.39–1.38 in) long, about 4–12 mm (0.16–0.47 in) wide and sharply pointed. The flowers are usually arranged in clusters of two to five in leaf axils on a peduncle 3–4 mm (0.12–0.16 in) long, the rachis 2.5–9 mm (0.098–0.354 in) long, each flower on a pedicel 1–2.5 mm (0.039–0.098 in) long. The sepals are 4.5–5.0 mm (0.18–0.20 in) long and joined at the base, the upper two lobes joined for most of their length and the lower three triangular and about 0.75 mm (0.030 in) long. The standard petal is broadly elliptic, 6.5–7.0 mm (0.26–0.28 in) long and wide, and yellow with orange markings. The wings are 6–7 mm (0.24–0.28 in) long and rich yellow, the keel about 5 mm (0.20 in) long and rich yellow. Flowering occurs from January to April and the fruit is a triangular pod 18–20 mm (0.71–0.79 in) long.

== Taxonomy ==
Daviesia tortuosa was first formally described in 1995 by Michael Crisp in Australian Systematic Botany from specimens he collected near Lake Grace in 1978. The specific epithet (tortuosa) means "zig-zag", referring to the branching of this species.

== Distribution and habitat ==
This daviesia grows in kwongan heath roughly between Kulin, Dumbleyung and Lake Grace in the Avon Wheatbelt and Mallee biogeographic regions of south-western Western Australia.

== Conservation status ==
Daviesia tortuosa is classified as "Priority Three" by the Government of Western Australia Department of Biodiversity, Conservation and Attractions, meaning that it is poorly known and known from only a few locations but is not under imminent threat.
