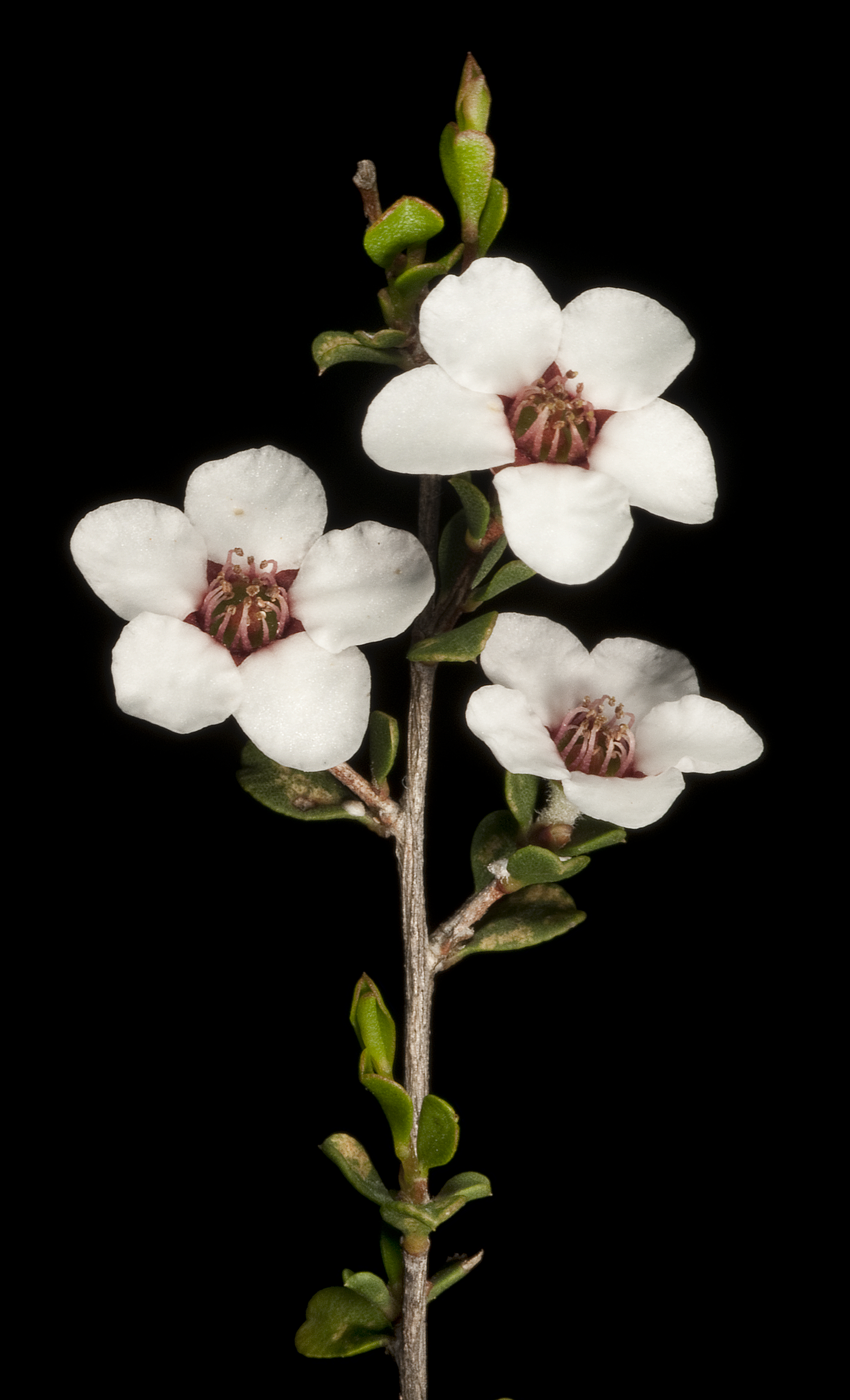

Conservation status
- Priority One — Poorly Known Taxa (DEC)

Scientific classification
- Kingdom: Plantae
- Clade: Tracheophytes
- Clade: Angiosperms
- Clade: Eudicots
- Clade: Rosids
- Order: Myrtales
- Family: Myrtaceae
- Genus: Apectospermum
- Species: A. exsertum

Binomial name
- Apectospermum exsertum (Joy Thomps.) Peter G.Wilson
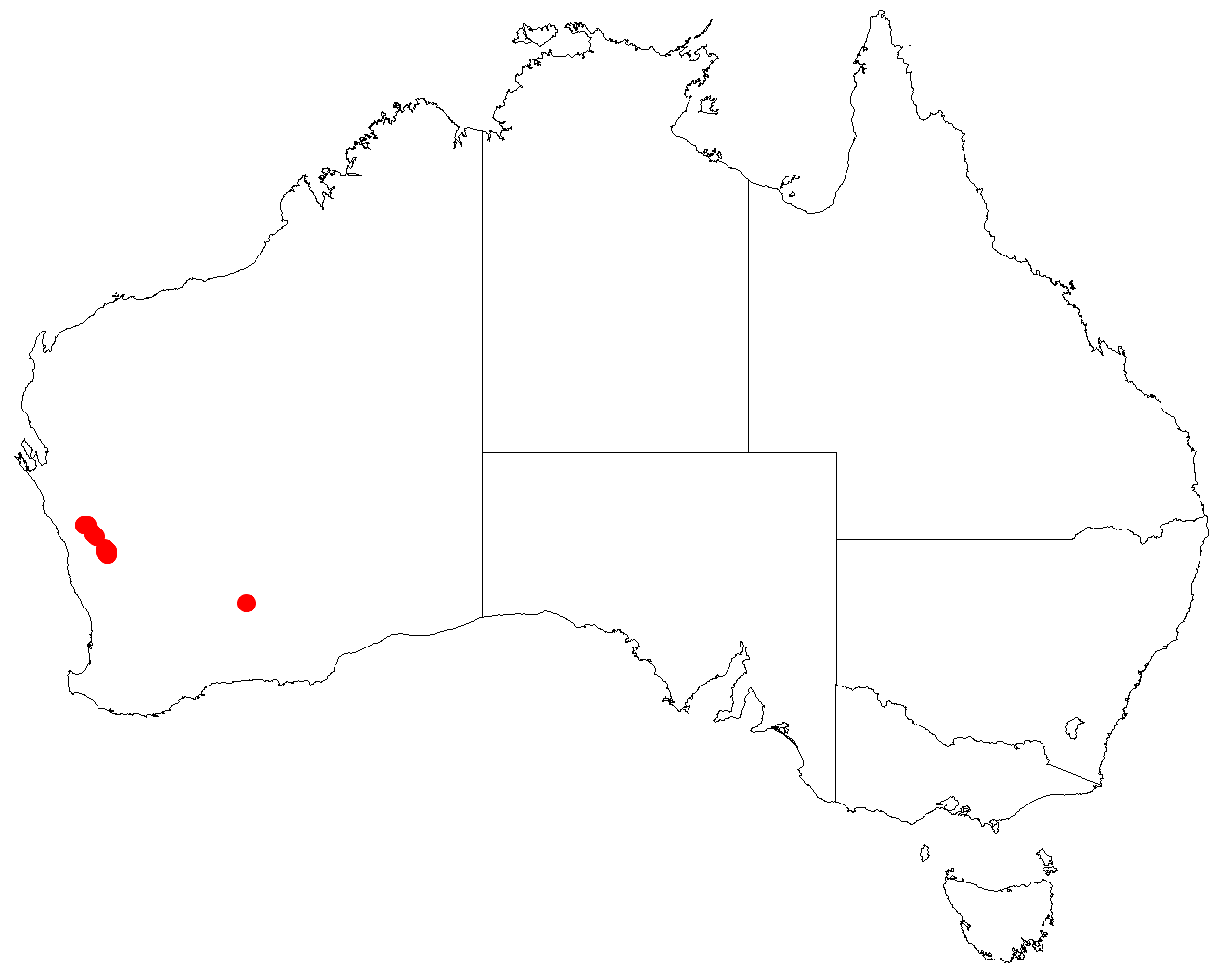
- Occurrence data from AVH

= Apectospermum exsertum =

Species of shrub

Apectospermum exsertum is a small, sparsely branched shrub that is endemic to Western Australia. It has thick, wedge-shaped to heart-shaped leaves with the narrower end towards the base, often with a sharply pointed tip, white flowers arranged singly or in groups of up to three and fruit that falls off when mature.

== Description ==
Apectospermum exsertum is a shrub that typically grows to a height of 0.3–0.6 m (1 ft 0 in – 2 ft 0 in) and has thin, firm bark on the older stems, and glabrous younger stems. The leaves are wedge-shaped to heart-shaped with the narrower end towards the base, mostly 3–5 mm (0.12–0.20 in) long and 2–3 mm (0.079–0.118 in) wide, often with a sharply pointed tip. The flowers are borne singly or in groups of up to three and are 5–8 mm (0.20–0.31 in) wide. There are reddish bracts and bracteoles at the base of the flower, the bracteoles falling off as the flower opens. The floral cup is about 2 mm (0.079 in) long, the sepals triangular 1.5–2 mm (0.059–0.079 in) long and the petals about 3 mm (0.12 in) long. The stamens are in bundles of about five and are 1.6 mm (0.063 in) long. Flowering occurs from August to September and the fruit is about 3 mm (0.12 in) in diameter with the remains of the sepals attached and the valves projecting upwards.

== Taxonomy and naming ==
This species was first formally described in 1989 by Joy Thompson as Leptospermum exsertum in the journal Telopea, based on plant material collected by John Stanley Beard near Tardun in 1973. In 2023, Peter Gordon Wilson transferred the species to the genus Apectospermum as A. exsertum in the journal Taxon. The specific epithet (exsertum) is a Latin word meaning "protruding", refers to the valves of the fruit.

== Distribution and habitat ==
This tea-tree is found on sand plains and sandy heath in the north-west corner of the Avon Wheatbelt biogeographic region.

== Conservation status ==
This species is classified as "Priority One" by the Government of Western Australia Department of Parks and Wildlife, meaning that it is known from only one or a few locations which are potentially at risk.
