= Apectospermum subtenue =

Scientific classification
- Kingdom: Plantae
- Clade: Tracheophytes
- Clade: Angiosperms
- Clade: Eudicots
- Clade: Rosids
- Order: Myrtales
- Family: Myrtaceae
- Genus: Apectospermum
- Species: A. subtenue

Binomial name
- Apectospermum subtenue (Joy Thomps.) Peter G.Wilson

Synonyms
- Leptospermum subtenue Joy Thomps.

Species of shrub

Apectospermum subtenue is a species of small shrub in the family Myrtaceae and is endemic to Western Australia. It has thick, elliptical, concave leaves, white or pink flowers and fruit that falls from the plant when mature. It occurs to the south of Kalgoorlie.

== Description ==
Apectospermum subtenue is a shrub that typically grows to a height of 1–1.5 mm (0.039–0.059 in). It has thin, rough bark and thin young stems that are silky hairy at first, soon glabrous. The leaves are thick, concave, elliptical 3–4 mm (0.12–0.16 in) long and 1–1.5 mm (0.039–0.059 in) wide, tapering to a thin petiole. The flowers are white or pink, up to 12 mm (0.47 in) wide and are borne singly or in pairs on the ends of long, thin side branches. The floral cup is dark-coloured and hairy, about 3 mm (0.12 in) long, tapering to a short pedicel. The sepals are broadly egg-shaped, about 2 mm (0.079 in) long, the petals about 4 mm (0.16 in) long and the stamens about 1 mm (0.039 in) long. Flowering mainly occurs from August to October.

== Taxonomy ==
This species was first formally described in 1989 by Joy Thompson (botanist) who gave it the name Leptospermum subtenue in the journal Telopea from specimens collected by Cecil Andrews, north of Esperance in 1903. In 2023, Peter Gordon Wilson transferred the species to the genus Apectospermum as A. macgillivrayi in the journal Taxon. The specific epithet (subtenue) means 'almost slender'.

== Distribution and habitat ==
This teatree is found in the Goldfields-Esperance region of Western Australia between Coolgardie and Esperance where it grows in lateritic soils.

== Conservation status ==
This species is listed as "not threatened" by the Western Australian Government Department of Parks and Wildlife.
