= Apectospermum =

Scientific classification
- Kingdom: Plantae
- Clade: Tracheophytes
- Clade: Angiosperms
- Clade: Eudicots
- Clade: Rosids
- Order: Myrtales
- Family: Myrtaceae
- Subfamily: Myrtoideae
- Tribe: Leptospermeae
- Genus: Apectospermum; Peter G.Wilson

Genus of flowering plants

Apectospermum is a genus of flowering plants in the myrtle family Myrtaceae previously included in Leptospermum. It includes four species native to Southwest Australia. It was first formally described by Peter Gordon Wilson and Margaret M. Heslewood in the journal Taxon.

== Species ==
The following is a list of species of Apectopspermum accepted by the Plants of the World Online as of August 2024.

- Apectospermum exsertum (Joy Thomps.) Peter G.Wilson
- Apectospermum macgillivrayi (Joy Thomps.) Peter G.Wilson
- Apectospermum spinescens (Endl.) Peter G.Wilson
- Apectospermum subtenue (Joy Thomps.) Peter G.Wilson
