= Apectospermum macgillivrayi =

Conservation status
- Priority Three — Poorly Known Taxa (DEC)

Scientific classification
- Kingdom: Plantae
- Clade: Tracheophytes
- Clade: Angiosperms
- Clade: Eudicots
- Clade: Rosids
- Order: Myrtales
- Family: Myrtaceae
- Genus: Apectospermum
- Species: A. macgillivrayi

Binomial name
- Apectospermum macgillivrayi (Joy Thomps.) Peter G.Wilson

Synonyms
- Leptospermum macgillivrayi Joy Thomps.

Species of shrub

Apectospermum macgillivrayi is a species of small, widely-branching shrub that is endemic to Western Australia. It has hard, knobbly bark, broadly egg-shaped leaves, flowers arranged singly on short side shoots and small fruit that fall from the plant at maturity. It is only known from two locations in the inland of the state.

== Description ==
Apectospermum macgillivrayi is a widely-branching shrub that typically grows to a height of 1 m (3 ft 3 in) and has hard, knobbly bark. The leaves are crowded, broadly egg-shaped, up to 8 mm (0.31 in) long and 5 mm (0.20 in) wide on a slightly flattened petiole about 1 mm (0.039 in) long. The flowers are borne singly on short side shoots and have large, papery bracts at the base of the bud. The floral cup is covered with long, white hairs and is about 3 mm (0.12 in) long. The sepals are about 1.5 mm (0.059 in) long, egg-shaped and papery. The petals have not been seen but the stamens are about 3 mm (0.12 in) long. Flowering probably mainly occurs from August to September and the fruit is 4–5 mm (0.16–0.20 in) in diameter with the remnants of the sepals attached, but which falls from the plant shortly after the seeds are released.

== Taxonomy and naming ==
This species was first formally described in 1989 by Joy Thompson (botanist) who gave it the name Apectospermum macgillivrayi in the journal Telopea from specimens collected by Donald McGillivray and Alex George near "Mt Jackson on road to Die Hardy Range" in 1976. In 2023, Peter Gordon Wilson transferred the species to the genus Apectospermum as A. macgillivrayi in the journal Taxon. The specific epithet (macgillivrayi) honours McGillivray, "who collected and photographed the first specimen".

== Distribution and habitat ==
This teatree is only known from two locations where it grows in open shrubland on soil derived from decaying granite north-east of Coolgardie.

== Conservation status ==
Apectospermum macgillivrayi is classified as "Priority Three" by the Government of Western Australia Department of Parks and Wildlife meaning that it is poorly known and known from only a few locations but is not under imminent threat.
