= Tarin Rock, Western Australia =

Tarin Rock
- Town
- Interactive map of Tarin Rock
- Coordinates: 33°06′S 118°14′E
- Country: Australia
- State: Western Australia
- LGA: Shire of Dumbleyung
- Location: 298 km (185 mi) from Perth; 399 km (248 mi) from Wagin
- Established: 1912

Government
  - State electorate: Roe
  - Federal division: O'Connor

Area
  - Total: 308.4 km^{2} (119.1 sq mi)

Population
  - Total: 36 (SAL 2021)
- Postcode: 6353

Tarin Rock (33°06′S 118°14′E) is a locality, railway siding and rock formation on the Wagin to Lake Grace branch line, located approximately 18 km east of Kukerin in Western Australia.

Tarin Rock was a stop on the Wagin to Newdegate railway line.

The surrounding areas produce wheat and other cereal crops. The primary remnants of the town include the Tarin Rock Tennis Club, the surge receival site for Cooperative Bulk Handling and the cemetery to the south.
