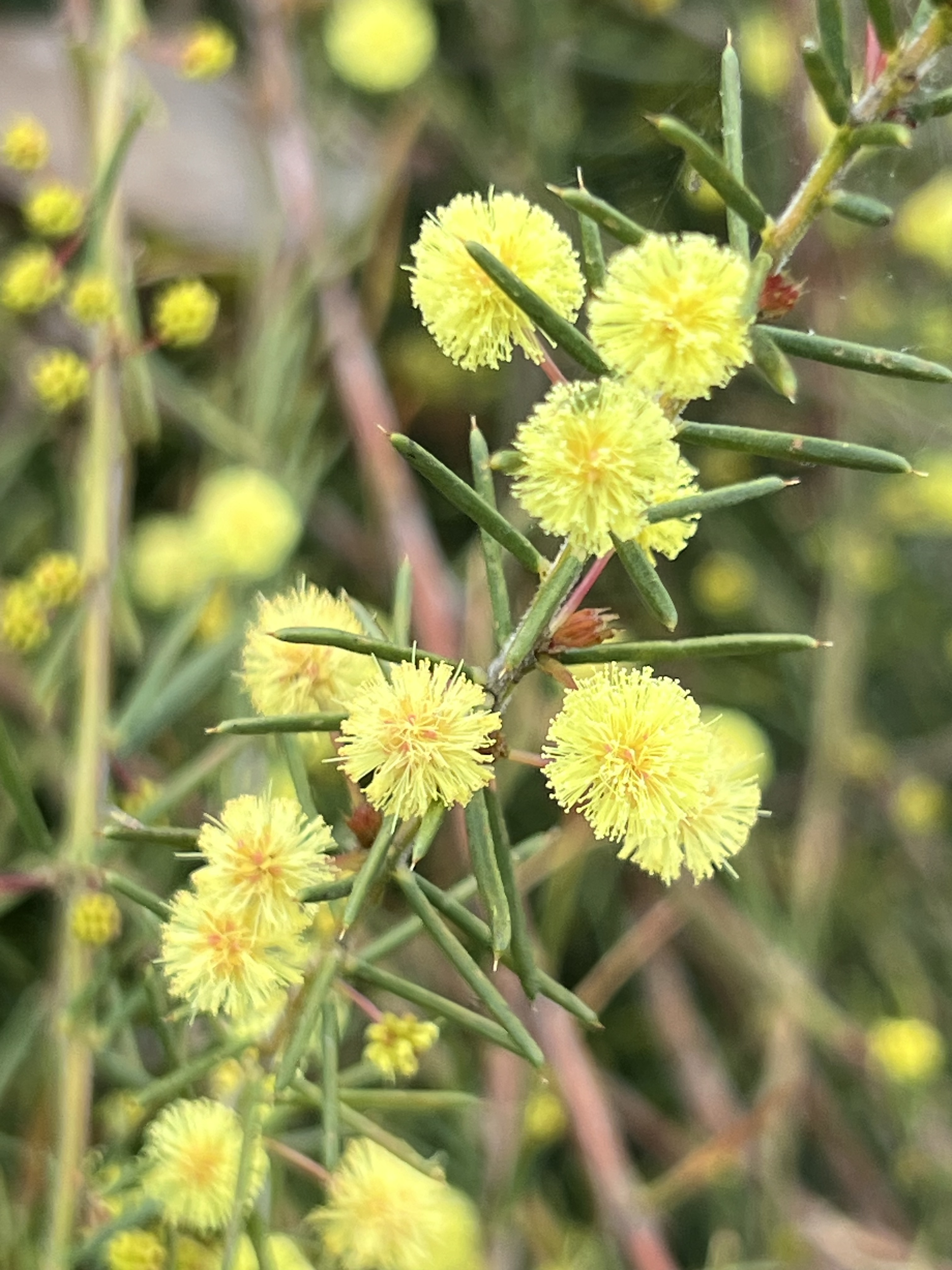

Scientific classification
- Kingdom: Plantae
- Clade: Tracheophytes
- Clade: Angiosperms
- Clade: Eudicots
- Clade: Rosids
- Order: Fabales
- Family: Fabaceae
- Subfamily: Caesalpinioideae
- Clade: Mimosoid clade
- Genus: Acacia
- Species: A. aculeatissima

Binomial name
- Acacia aculeatissima J.F.Macbr.
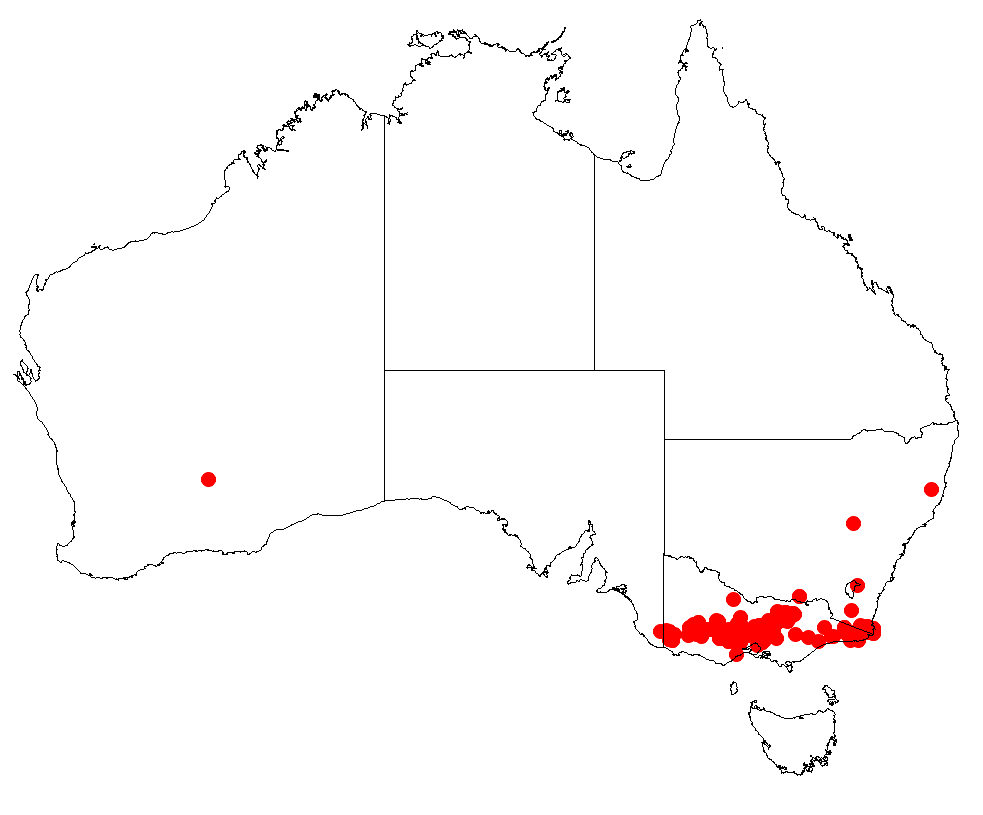
- Occurrence data from AVH

Synonyms
- Acacia tenuifolia F.Muell. nom. inval., nom. nud.; Acacia tenuifolia F.Muell. nom. illeg.; Acacia tenuifolia F.Muell. isonym; Racosperma aculeatissimum (J.F.Macbr.) Pedley

= Acacia aculeatissima =

Thin-leaf wattle

Species of legume

Acacia aculeatissima, commonly known as thin-leaf wattle or snake wattle, is a species of flowering plant in the family Fabaceae and is endemic to south-eastern continental Australia. It is usually a prostrate shrub with sharply pointed, needle-shaped phyllodes, flowers arranged in up to 3 more or less spherical heads of 15 to 25 flowers, and linear, papery pods up to 60 mm (2.4 in) long.

== Description ==
Acacia aculeatissima is an open, prostrate shrub that typically grows to a height of up to 50 cm (20 in), rarely to 1 m (3 ft 3 in) and has finely ribbed, hairy branchlets. Its phyllodes are needle-shaped, curved backwards, 5–12 mm (0.20–0.47 in) long and 0.5–1 mm (0.020–0.039 in) wide and sharply pointed. Up to 3 usually spherical heads of flowers are borne in the axils of phyllodes on a peduncle 5–13 mm (0.20–0.51 in) long, each head with 15 to 25 pale yellow to yellow flowers. Flowering occurs between August and November and the pod is straight or slightly curved and papery, 30–60 mm (1.2–2.4 in) long and 2–4 mm (0.079–0.157 in) wide containing oblong seeds 3.5–4.0 mm (0.14–0.16 in) long.

== Taxonomy ==
Acacia aculeatissima was first formally described in 1919 by the American botanist James Francis Macbride in 1919 in the article Notes on certain Leguminosae s published in the Contributions of the Gray Herbarium of Harvard University from specimens collected "in dry stony ranges near Ballarat, towards the Goulburn and Broken Rivers" in 1853. The specific epithet (aculeatissima) means "very prickly or thorny".

== Distribution and habitat ==
This species of wattle often grows in rocky areas in woodland, forest and heath in soils derived from sedimentary rocks, and occurs south from Mount Imlay in New South Wales, and in the southern part of Victoria where it is more common.

== See also ==
- List of Acacia species
