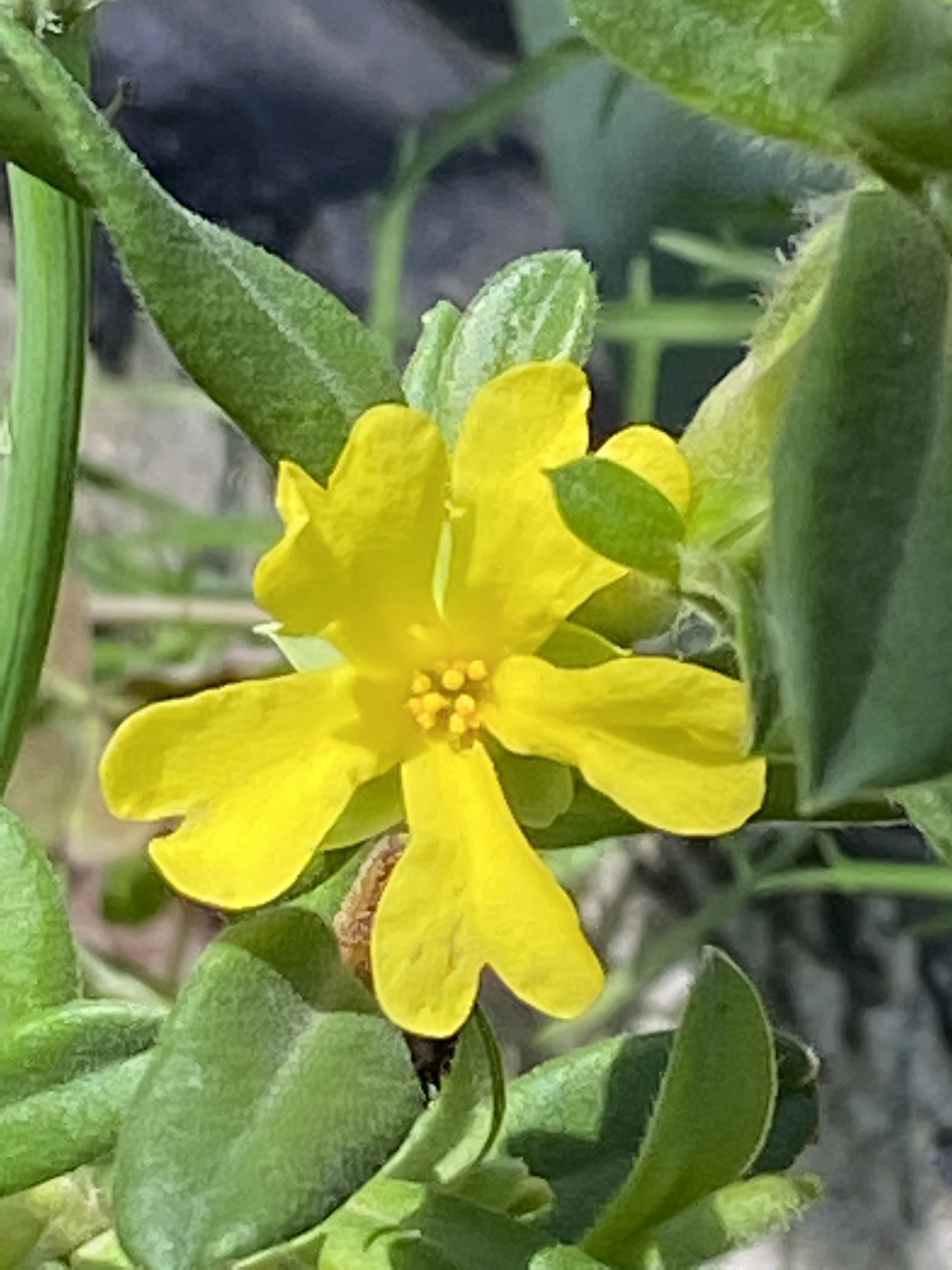
- In the Australian National Botanic Gardens

Scientific classification
- Kingdom: Plantae
- Clade: Embryophytes
- Clade: Tracheophytes
- Clade: Angiosperms
- Clade: Eudicots
- Order: Dilleniales
- Family: Dilleniaceae
- Genus: Hibbertia
- Species: H. circinata

Binomial name
- Hibbertia circinata K.L.McDougall & G.T.Wright

= Hibbertia circinata =

Species of flowering plant

Hibbertia circinata is a species of flowering plant in the order Dilleniales and is endemic to eastern Australia. It is a tall, upright shrub with yellow flowers and broad, dark green leaves. It is a critically endangered species endemic to New South Wales.

== Description ==
Hibbertia circinata is a small shrub 1–1.5 m (3 ft 3 in – 4 ft 11 in) tall with numerous more or less upright stems covered with soft, simple, spreading to almost fused, straight, finely curled or coiled hairs to 1.25 mm (0.049 in) long. The new growth is thickly covered with long, soft, straight hairs, leaves persisting on lower branches. The leaves are partly stem-clasping, wide, sessile, lance shaped or sometimes oblong to spathulate, margins smooth or rarely toothed at the apex, 15–55 mm (0.59–2.17 in) long, 5–12 mm (0.20–0.47 in) wide. The leaf upper surface is dark green with soft, almost closely pressed hairs, varying from thickly coiled, to 0.2 mm (0.0079 in) in diameter to more or less straight or curled up to 2.5 mm (0.098 in) long. The underside is light green with hairs similar to those on the upper surface but usually not as closely appressed, and a rounded apex. The yellow flowers have five, smooth, egg-shaped petals, 9–13 mm (0.35–0.51 in) long, 7–11 mm (0.28–0.43 in) wide, broadly notched at the apex, borne singly at the end of branches, sessile, and 2-4 leaf like bracts 3–12 mm (0.12–0.47 in) long, becoming normal leaves near the base of the flower. The sepals are oval, rounded, sharply pointed or obovate, 5–7 mm (0.20–0.28 in) long and 2.5–3.5 mm (0.098–0.138 in) wide, outer sepals sparsely to thickly covered with simple, soft, short hairs on both sides and occasionally ending in a minute sharp point. The flowers have 9-13 stamens more or less equal in length, filaments about 1.5 mm (0.059 in) long and separated. Flowering has been observed throughout the year but mostly abundant in spring.

== Taxonomy ==
Hibbertia circinata was first formally described in 2018 by K.L. McDougall and G.T. Wright and the description was published in the journal Telopea.

== Distribution and habitat ==
This species is only known from one location on the south coast of New South Wales on the summit of Mount Imlay National Park east of Eden. It grows in shrubby woodland dominated by Eucalyptus sieberi.

== Conservation status ==
Hibbertia circinata is classified as "critically endangered" under the Biodiversity Conservation Act 2016. Its main threats are loss of habitat, a small, single population, few mature plants and threats of plant pathogens.
