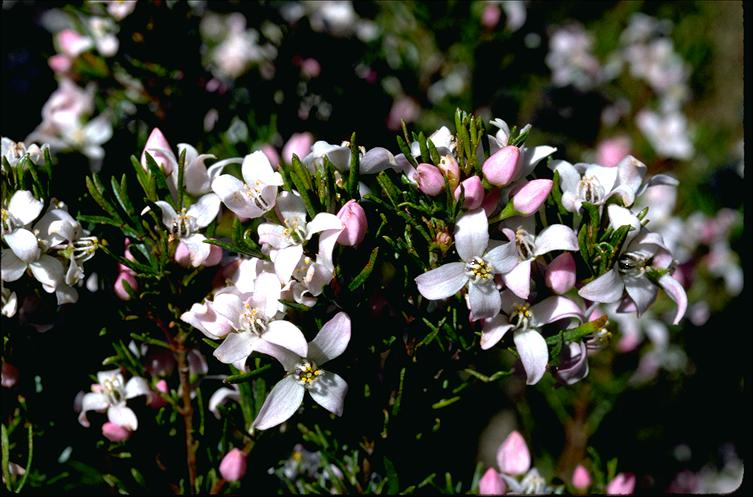
- Boronia citriodora on Needle Rock

Scientific classification
- Kingdom: Plantae
- Clade: Tracheophytes
- Clade: Angiosperms
- Clade: Eudicots
- Clade: Rosids
- Order: Sapindales
- Family: Rutaceae
- Genus: Boronia
- Species: B. citriodora

Binomial name
- Boronia citriodora Gunn ex Hook.f.
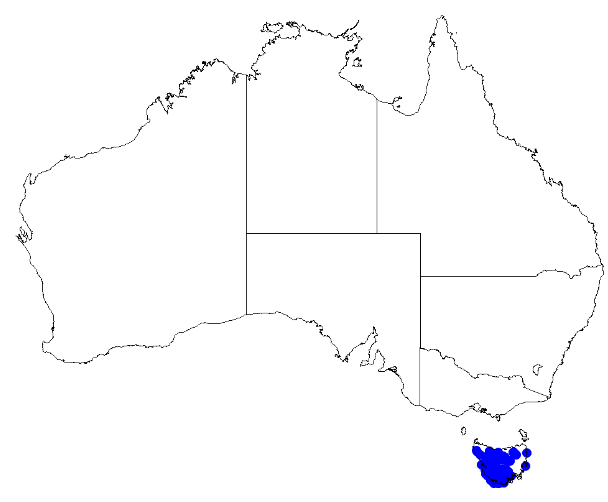
- Occurrence data from Australasian Virtual Herbarium

= Boronia citriodora =

Lemon-scented boronia

Species of flowering plant

Boronia citriodora, commonly known as lemon-scented boronia, lemon plant or lemon thyme, is a woody shrub that is endemic to Tasmania. It has pinnate leaves and white to pink flowers that are arranged singly or in groups of up to seven, in the leaf axils or on the ends of the branches.

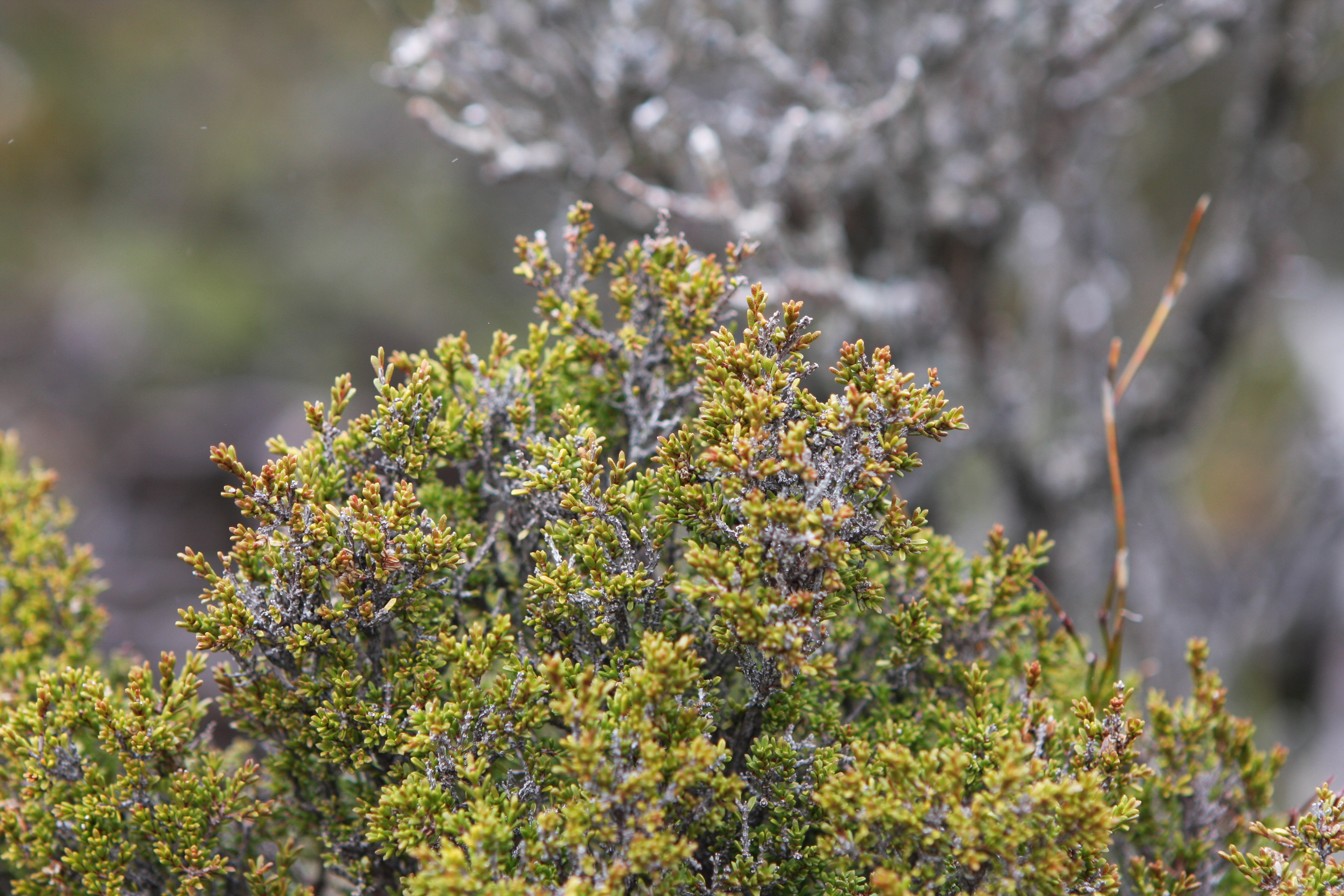
habit in a subalpine sclerophyll woodland

== Description ==
Boronia citriodora is a woody shrub that is sometimes prostrate, otherwise erect and growing to a height of 3 m (9.8 ft). It has pinnate leaves that are 7–25 mm (0.28–0.98 in) long and 7–30 mm (0.28–1.2 in) wide in outline with between three and nine leaflets, on a petiole 1.5–6 mm (0.059–0.24 in) long. The end leaflet is narrow elliptic to narrow lance-shaped, 3.5–15 mm (0.14–0.59 in) long and 0.5–4 mm (0.020–0.16 in) wide. The side leaflets are similar but longer. The flowers are white to pink and are arranged singly or in groups of up to seven in leaf axils or on the ends of branches on a stalk 1–8 mm (0.039–0.31 in) long. The four sepals are triangular, 0.5–2.5 mm (0.02–0.1 in) long and wide. The four petals are 3.5–8.5 mm (0.1–0.3 in) long and the eight stamens have a few short hairs. Flowering occurs from November to February and the mature fruit are smooth, 3–4 mm (0.12–0.16 in) long and 1.5–2 mm (0.059–0.079 in) wide.

== Taxonomy and naming ==
Boronia citriodora was first formally described in 1855 by Joseph Dalton Hooker from an unpublished description by Ronald Campbell Gunn and the description was published in The botany of the Antarctic voyage of H.M. Discovery ships Erebus and Terror. The name is derived from the characteristic lemon scent of the foliage. Hooker noted that the plant has a "strong and delicious smell of lemons" and that the species was called the 'lemon-plant' by early Tasmanian colonists.

In 2003, Marco Duretto described three subspecies:

- Boronia citriodora subsp. citriodora that has smooth sepals and leaves less than 15 mm (0.59 in) long;
- Boronia citriodora subsp. orientalis that has hairy sepals;
- Boronia citriodora subsp. paulwilsonii that has smooth sepals and at least some leaves more than 15 mm (0.59 in) long.

== Distribution and habitat ==
Lemon-scented boronia grows in heath, woodland and near rainforest, often in rocky places.

- Subspecies citriodora only grows on the Central Highlands of Tasmania, at altitudes above 900 m (3,000 ft) with disjunct populations further south, including on Mount Field.
- Subspecies orientalis is only known from Ben Lomond and Mount Barrow;
- Subspecies paulwilsonii is only known from the south-west of Tasmania, south from Macquarie Harbour and west from Mount Shea.

== Use in horticulture ==
Boronia citriodora is cultivated as an ornamental plant for use in gardens. It tolerates sun, shade, wind, heavy frost; and dry, sandy or waterlogged soils.
