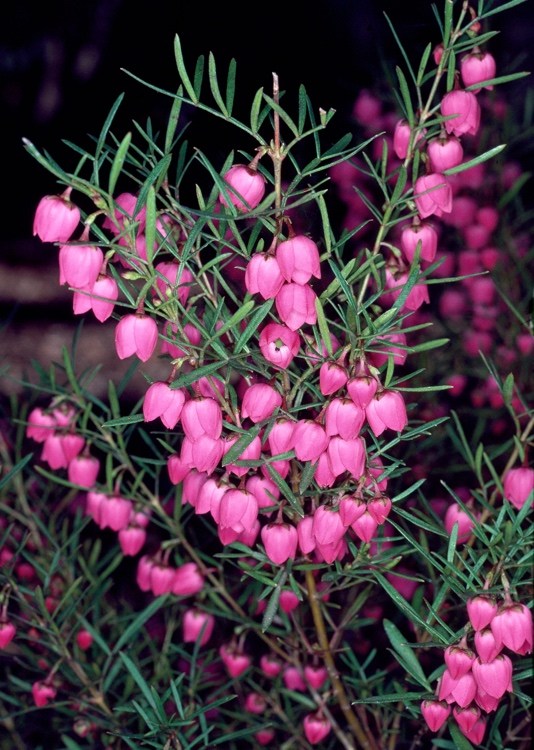
- Boronia heterophylla in the Australian National Botanic Gardens

Scientific classification
- Kingdom: Plantae
- Clade: Tracheophytes
- Clade: Angiosperms
- Clade: Eudicots
- Clade: Rosids
- Order: Sapindales
- Family: Rutaceae
- Genus: Boronia
- Species: B. heterophylla

Binomial name
- Boronia heterophylla F.Muell.
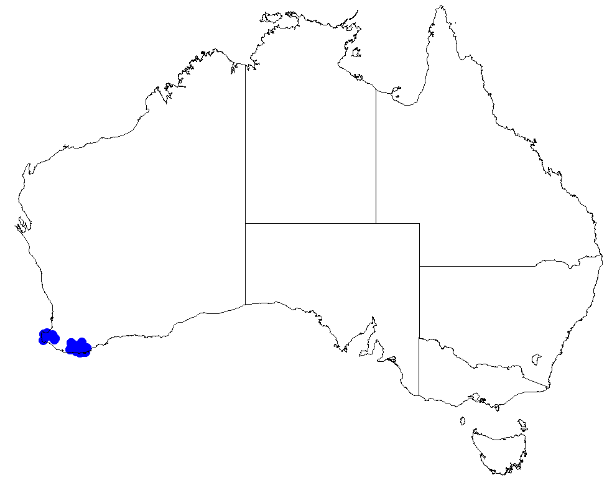
- Occurrence data from Australasian Virtual Herbarium

Synonyms
- Boronia heterophylla F.Muell. var. heterophylla; Boronia pteropoda Turcz.; Boronia heterophylla var. brevipes Hook.f.

= Boronia heterophylla =

Red boronia

Species of flowering plant

Boronia heterophylla, commonly known as red boronia or Kalgan boronia, is a plant in the citrus family Rutaceae, and is endemic to the south-west of Western Australia. It is an erect, slender shrub with trifoliate leaves and deep pink to red, four-petalled flowers arranged singly in leaf axils.

== Description ==
Boronia heterophylla is a shrub which grows to a height of 1–3 m (3–10 ft) and has slender branches. The leaves are usually trifoliate with linear leaflets 20–30 mm (0.8–1 in) long on a petiole 20–30 mm (0.8–1 in) long. The leaves are only rarely simple. The flowers are deep pink to red and arranged singly in leaf axils on a thin, top-shaped, hanging pedicel about 10 mm (0.4 in) long. The four sepals are more or less round with a pointed tip and 2–3 mm (0.08–0.1 in) long. The four petals are about 8 mm (0.3 in) long and hairy on the inner side. The eight stamens alternate in length. The stamens near the sepals are black, sterile and about 1.2 mm (0.05 in) long and the ones near the petals are fertile but only about 0.5 mm (0.02 in) long. Flowering from September to November.

== Taxonomy and naming ==
Boronia heterophylla was first formally described in 1860 by Ferdinand von Mueller and the description was published in Fragmenta phytographiae Australiae. The specific epithet (heterophylla) is derived from the ancient Greek words heteros (ἕτερος) meaning "different" and phyllon (φύλλον) meaning "leaf", referring to the variable leaves.

== Distribution and habitat ==
The red boronia is usually found growing near streams between Busselton and Albany in the Esperance Plains, Jarrah Forest, Swan Coastal Plain and Warren biogeographic regions of Western Australia.

== Conservation ==
Boronia heterophylla is listed as "not threatened" by the Government of Western Australia Department of Parks and Wildlife.
