= Glenbrook Native Plant Reserve =

Coordinates: 33.7643°S 150.6219°E

The Glenbrook Native Plant Reserve is a small botanical garden and arboretum of around 2 hectares (4.9 acres) in Glenbrook, New South Wales, Australia, featuring Australian native plants, principally those indigenous to the Blue Mountains. It contains a small nursery and education centre, as well as a small landscaped garden and the local flora reserve, with a number of walking trails and a wide range of local species represented.

It is tended by the Blue Mountains Branch of the Australian Plants Society.

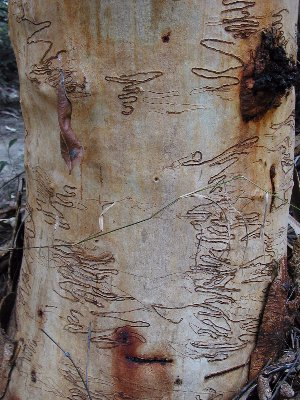
Scribbly Gum (Eucalyptus haemastoma) trunk

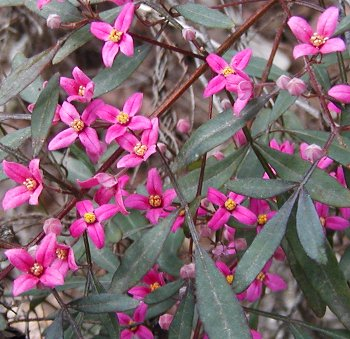
Boronia fraseri

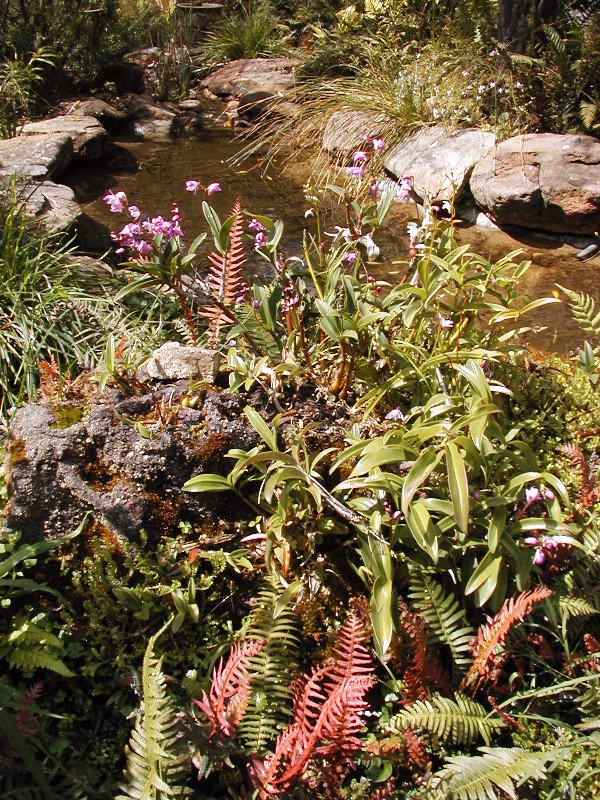
Rasp Ferns & Dendrobium kingianum around the pond at the Reserve

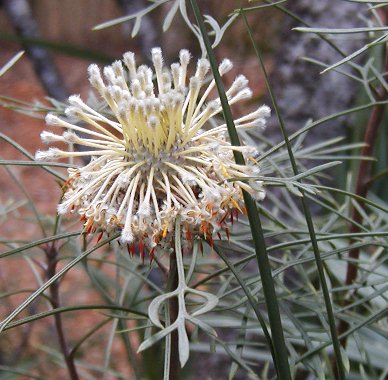
Isopogon dawsonii
