= Mount Imlay National Park =

National park in New South Wales, Australia

- IUCN category II (national park)
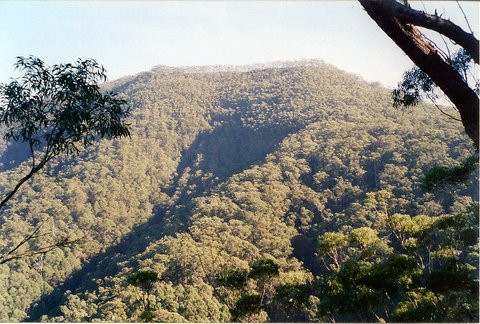
- Mount Imlay, 886 metres above sea level

- Location within New South Wales
- Location: New South Wales
- Nearest city: Eden
- Coordinates: 37.17994°S 149.73506°E
- Area: 48 km^{2} (19 sq mi)
- Established: 21 July 1972
- Governing body: NSW National Parks and Wildlife Service
- Website: Official website

Mount Imlay is a national park in New South Wales (Australia), 387 km south of Sydney, named after the Imlay brothers, who were early pioneers to the district. It is accessed from the Princes Highway, south of Eden, New South Wales. The mountain is called "Balawan" by Bidwell and Yuin peoples, and it is very important for their culture and spiritual teachings.

The vegetation is mostly eucalyptus forest. The Imlay mallee and Imlay boronia are rare plants growing near the mountain's summit. However, there is a 2-hectare (4.9-acre) rainforest remnant surviving in a fire-free gully. It consists mostly of black olive berry trees. The park contains large populations of wombats and superb lyrebirds.

== Geology ==
Most of Mount Imlay National Park was formed during the Ordovician period, 500 to 435 million years ago, from sedimentary and metamorphosed rocks of the Mallacoota Beds, part of the Southern Highlands Fold Belt, including greywacke, sandstone and shale. The summit of Mount Imlay and the upper slopes are younger, with Devonian (395 to 345 million years ago) rocks of the Merimbula Group, lying above the Ordovician sediments. The Merimbula Group includes sandstone, conglomerates, quartzite, siltstone and shale. Quaternary sediments form narrow river flats along the Towamba River on the northern edge of the park.

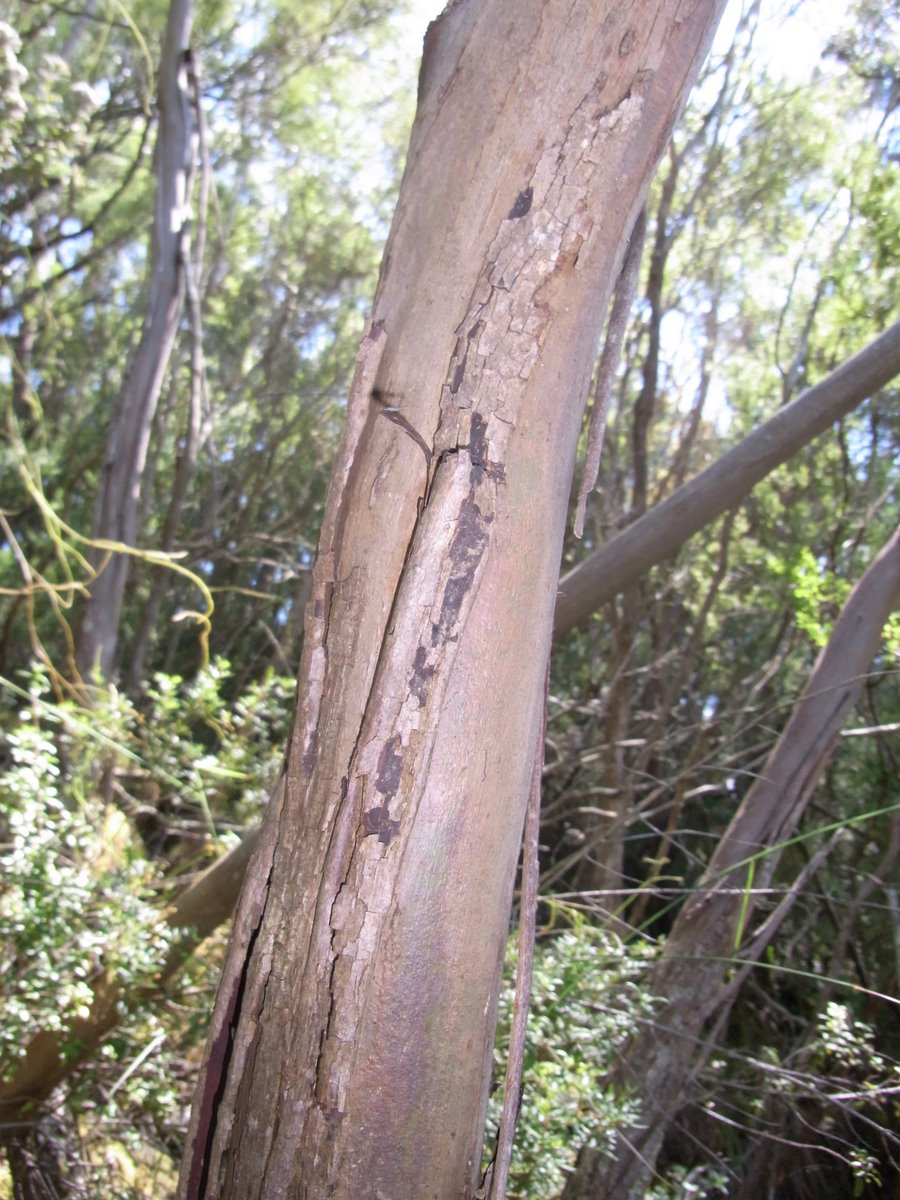
the critically endangered Imlay mallee

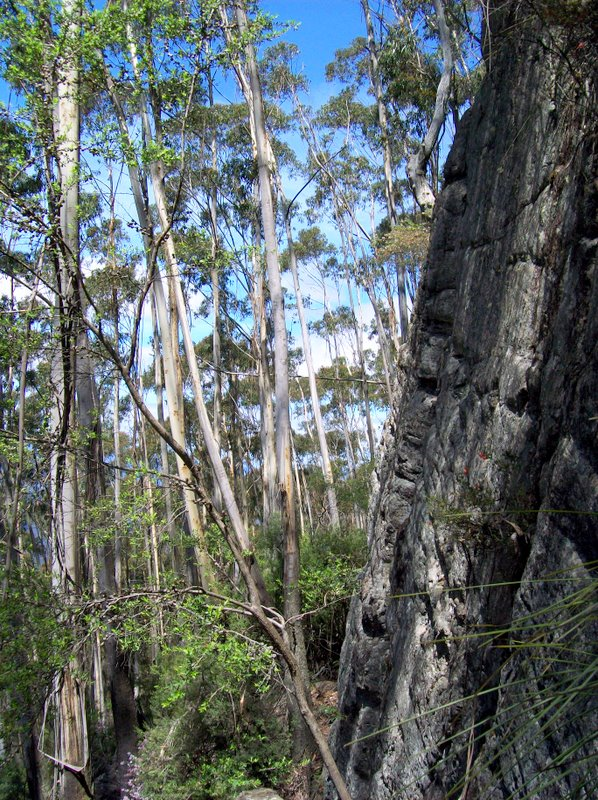
White ash & sandstone below the high ridge at Mount Imlay

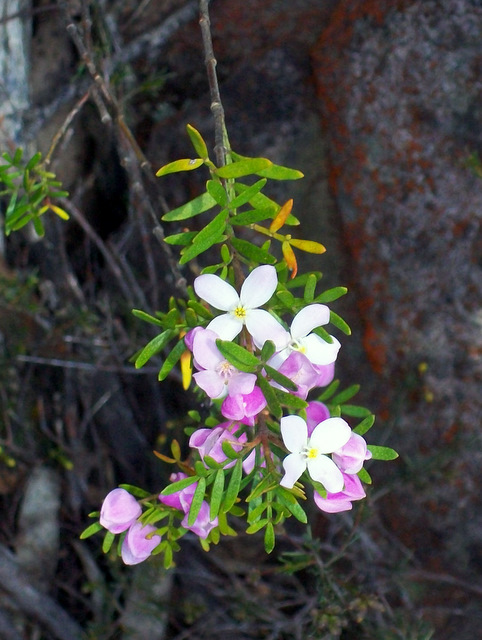
The rare Imlay boronia near the mountain's summit

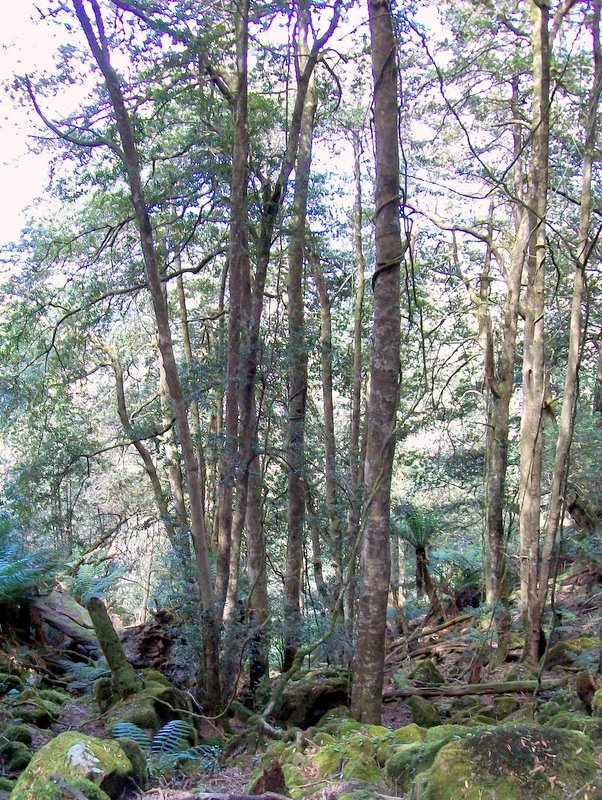
Gully rainforest at Mount Imlay with the black olive berry

== See also ==
- Protected areas of New South Wales
