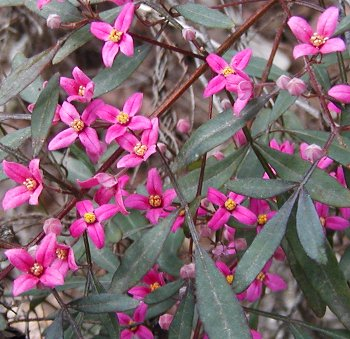
- Boronia fraseri at the Glenbrook Native Plant Reserve, NSW

Scientific classification
- Kingdom: Plantae
- Clade: Tracheophytes
- Clade: Angiosperms
- Clade: Eudicots
- Clade: Rosids
- Order: Sapindales
- Family: Rutaceae
- Subfamily: Zanthoxyloideae
- Genus: Boronia; Sm.

Species
- About 160; see List of Boronia species

= Boronia =

Genus of flowering plants

Boronia is a genus of about 160 species of flowering plants in the citrus family Rutaceae. Most are endemic to Australia with a few species in New Caledonia, which were previously placed in the genus Boronella. They occur in all Australian states but the genus is under review and a number of species are yet to be described or have the description published. Boronias are similar to familiar plants in the genera Zieria, Eriostemon and Correa but can be distinguished from them by the number of petals or stamens. Some species have a distinctive fragrance and are popular garden plants.

== Description ==
Plants in the genus Boronia are nearly always shrubs although a very small number occur as herbs or as small trees. The leaves are usually arranged in opposite pairs and may be simple leaves or compound leaves with up to nineteen or more leaflets, in either a pinnate or bipinnate arrangement. The flowers are arranged in groups in the leaf axils or on the ends of the branches and have both male and female parts. There are usually four separate sepals, usually four separate petals and generally eight stamens. (In Zieria there are only four stamens, Eriostemon species have five petals and in Correa the petals are joined to form a bell-shaped tube.) There are four carpels with their styles fused and there are two ovules in each carpel.

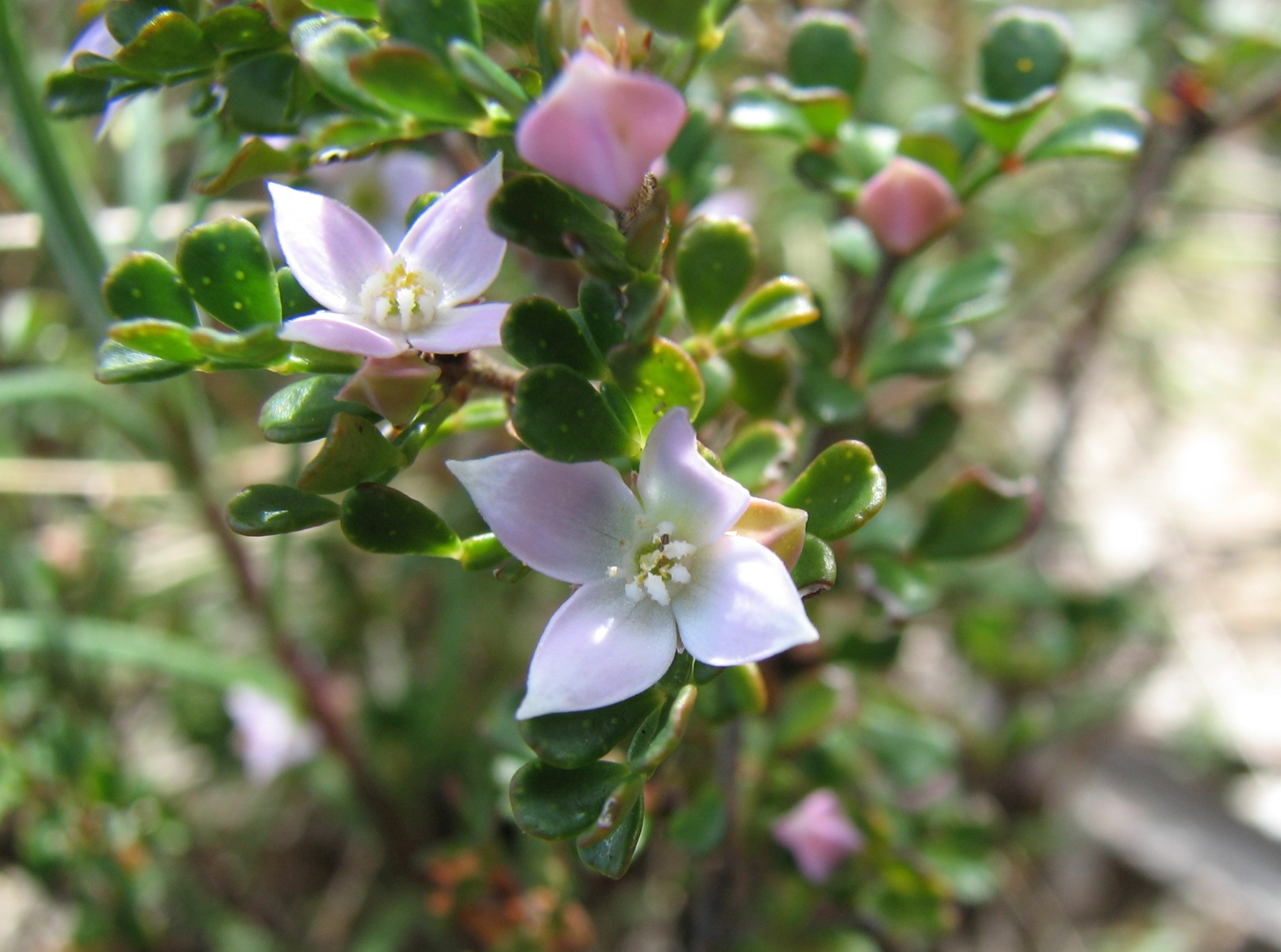
Boronia algida in Mount Buffalo National Park

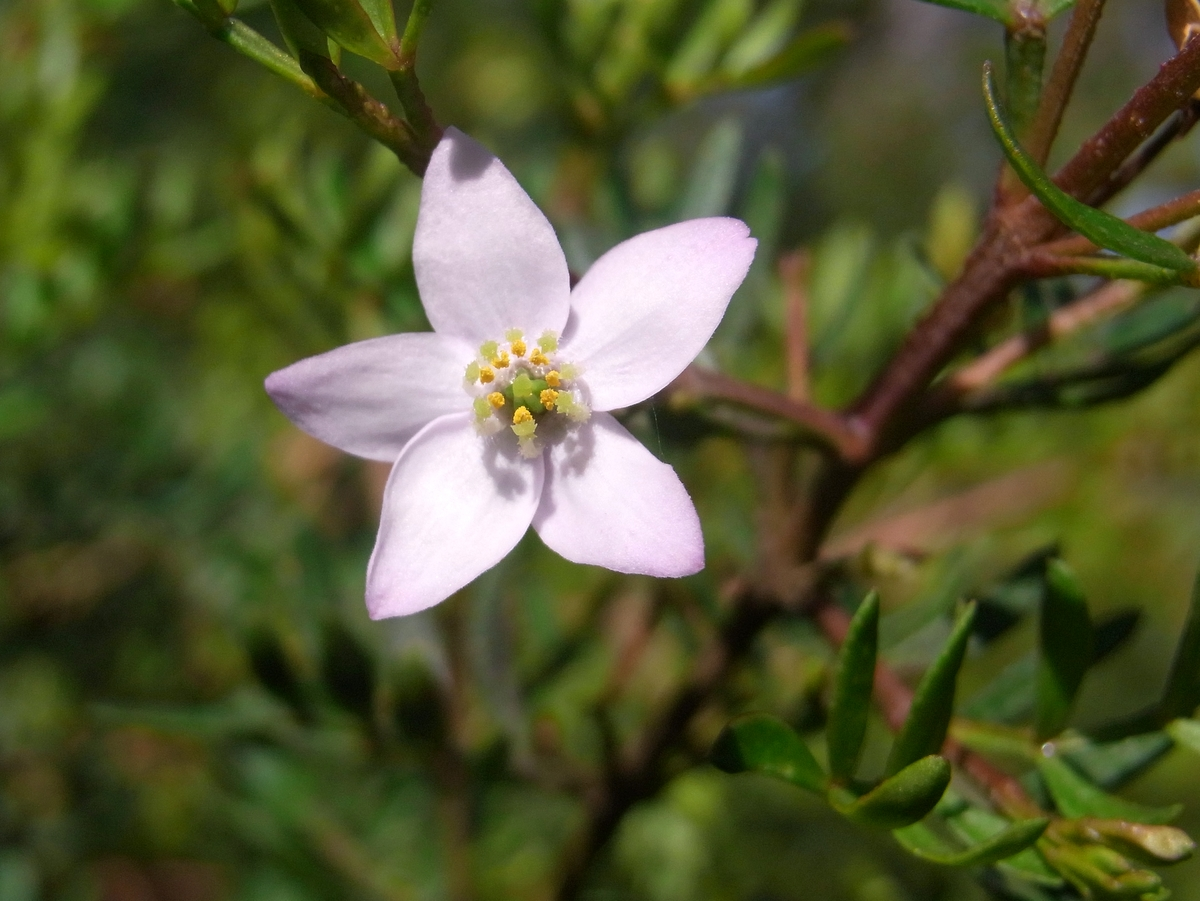
Boronia imlayensis in Mount Imlay National Park

== Taxonomy and naming ==
The genus Boronia was first formally described in 1798 by James Edward Smith and the description was published in Tracts Relating to Natural History. The name Boronia honours Francesco Borone (1769 - 1794), Italian naturalist and plant collector, who assisted John Sibthorp in Greece and Turkey, Adam Afzelius in Sierra Leone and James Edward Smith during his European tour in 1787.

Boronia, an outer suburb of Melbourne in Australia was named after a boronia found growing in the area.

== Distribution and habitat ==
Boronias are found in all states and mainland territories of Australia and generally grow in open forests or woodlands, only rarely in rainforests or arid areas.

== Use in horticulture ==
Boronias, especially B. megastigma, are known for their perfumed flowers. Most are regarded as desirable specimens in the garden, however, many are difficult to grow in cultivation. All species require excellent drainage and part shade.

== See also ==
- List of Boronia species
