= Eden Killer Whale Museum =

Australian museum

Coordinates: 37.0686°S 149.9086°E

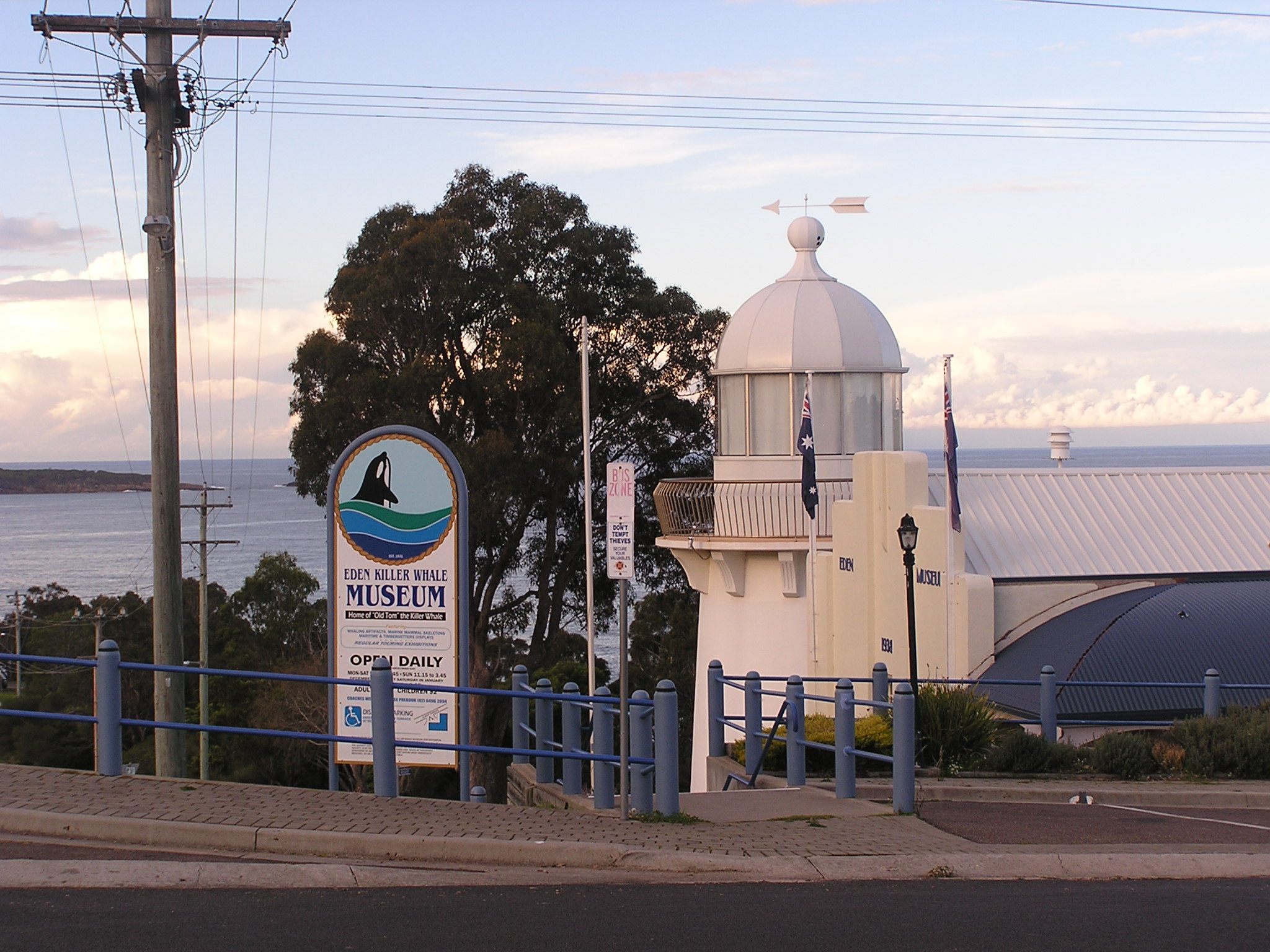
Killer whale museum at Eden.

The Eden Killer Whale Museum is a museum in Eden, New South Wales, Australia. It was originally built to house the skeleton of the orca "Old Tom" and tell the story of Old Tom and the other Killer whales of Eden. The local historical society is based at the museum, where it displays and houses between five and ten thousand items, focusing on the Australian whaling industry, general maritime and fishing artifacts, the timber industry, and local social history.
