= Ingrid Visser =

Ingrid Visser may refer to:

- Ingrid Visser (volleyball) (1977–2013), volleyball player from the Netherlands
- Ingrid Visser (biologist) (born 1966), orca researcher from New Zealand
