= Old Tom (orca) =

Killer whale known to Australian whalers

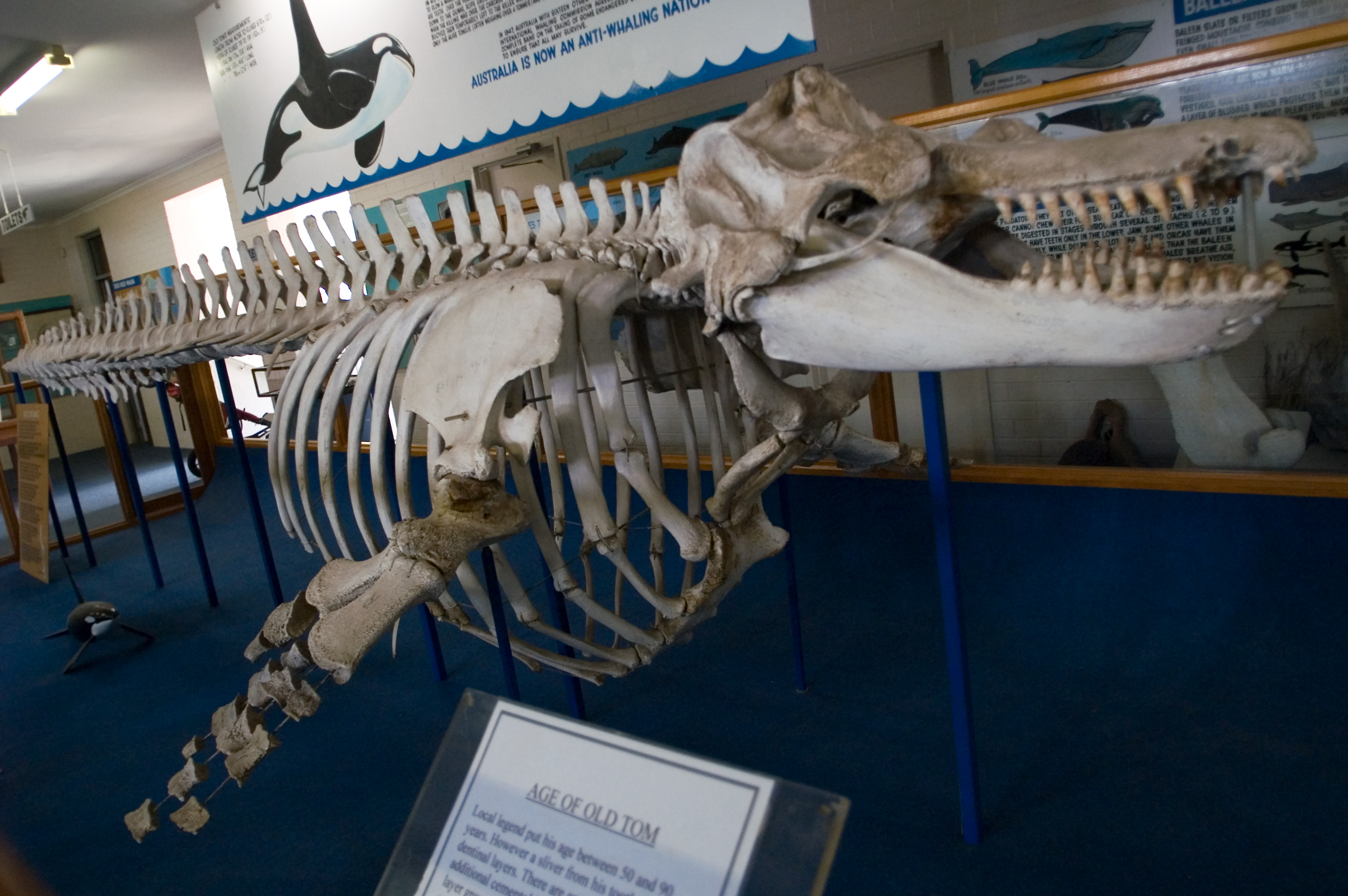
- Skeleton of Old Tom in the Eden Killer Whale Museum
- Species: Orca (Orcinus orca)
- Sex: Male
- Died: September 1930
- Known for: Cooperation with whalers

Old Tom (c. 1860s/1895 – September 1930) was a male orca (killer whale) who cooperated with and assisted whalers in the port of Eden, New South Wales, on the southeast coast of Australia. Old Tom was believed to be the leader of a pod of orcas which helped the whalers by herding baleen whales into Twofold Bay. This pod was also known as "the killers of Eden".

On 17 September 1930, Old Tom was found dead in Twofold Bay. Before his death, he was thought to be over 90 years old, assisting three generations of the Davidson family whalers. Examination of his teeth indicated he died around age 35, but this method of age determination is now believed to be inaccurate for older animals.

Old Tom's bones were preserved and his skeleton is now on display in the Eden Killer Whale Museum. Old Tom measured 22 feet (6.7 m) and weighed 12,000 pounds (6 tons), with a 3.33 ft (1.01 m) skull and teeth about 5.31 inches (135 mm) long.

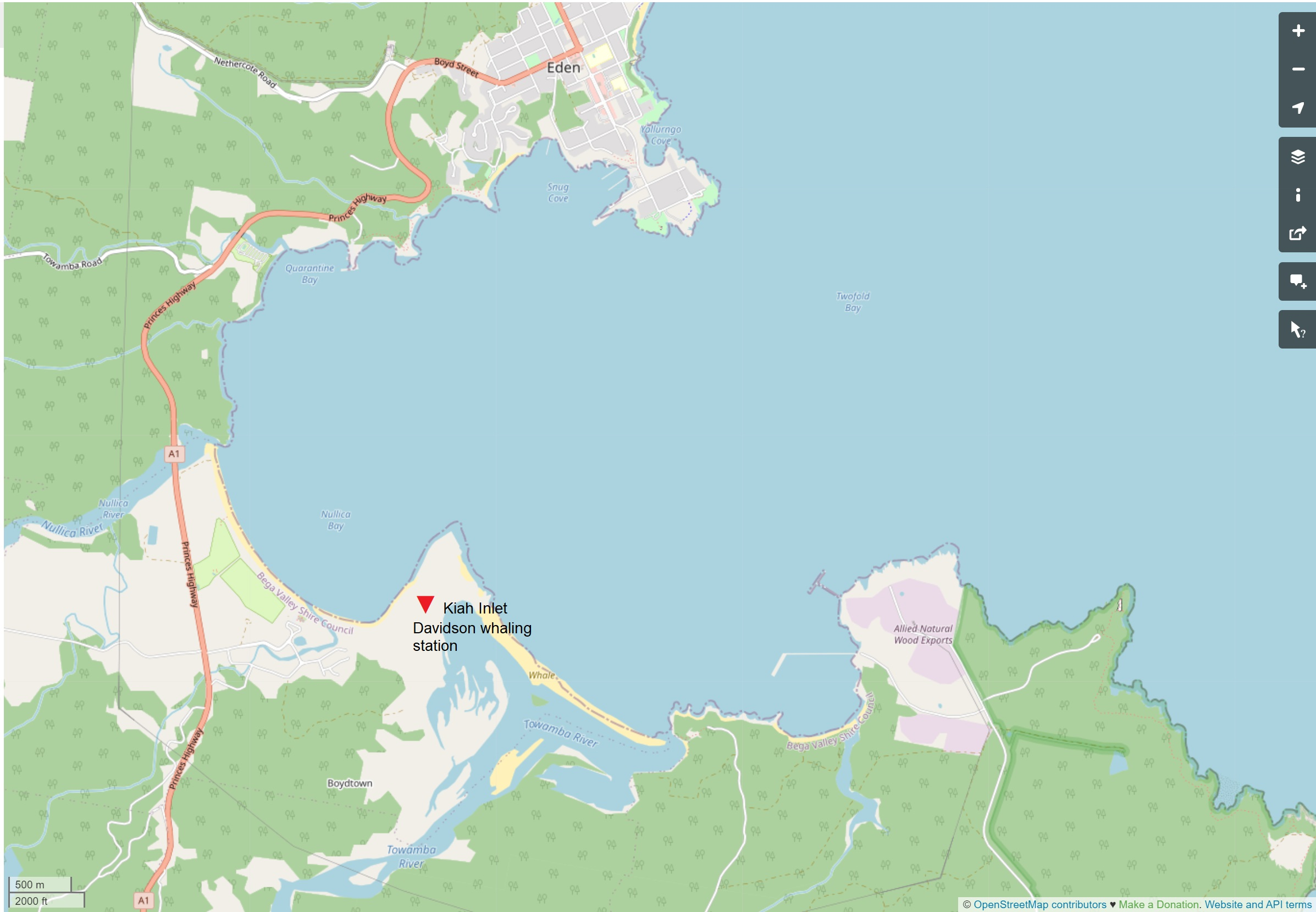
Twofold Bay and surrounding area, marking the Davidson family whaling station

== History ==
=== Eden and the Davidson family ===
The Davidson family was the only group of whalers that resided in Eden year-round. They relied on traditional whaling techniques, such as row boats and hand harpoons, that did not disturb or put stress on the orcas with loud noise, while also reducing operating costs.

Eden, first established in 1842, is located 470 km (290 mi) south of Sydney in the greater area of Twofold Bay. It is a town with dense forests to the west and the sea to the east. Eden wharf is located in Snug Cove, opposite of Davidson Whaling Station, located in Kiah Inlet. Leatherjacket Bay, outside of South Head, was frequently used by the orcas as a forward base. Eden is mostly known for its significance to the whaling history in Australia in the 19th century.

=== Indigenous Australians and orcas ===
Around 10,000 years ago, the relationship between orcas, referred to as beowas ('brothers' in English) and whalers began with the Katunga, the Indigenous Australian whalers. The Katunga, translated to "sea coast people" or "saltwater people", saw orcas as their reincarnated ancestors, whalers in particular, due to the similarity in coloration of the orcas and the traditional black and white clothing worn during their corroboree ceremonies. During this ceremony people interact with the Dreamtime through dance, music and costumes. The belief of orcas harboring the souls of the lost whalers occurred with the coincidence of a new orca appearing each time a whaler died. Orcas were seen as "working-dogs": playful, helpful, and friendly.

=== Davidson family ===
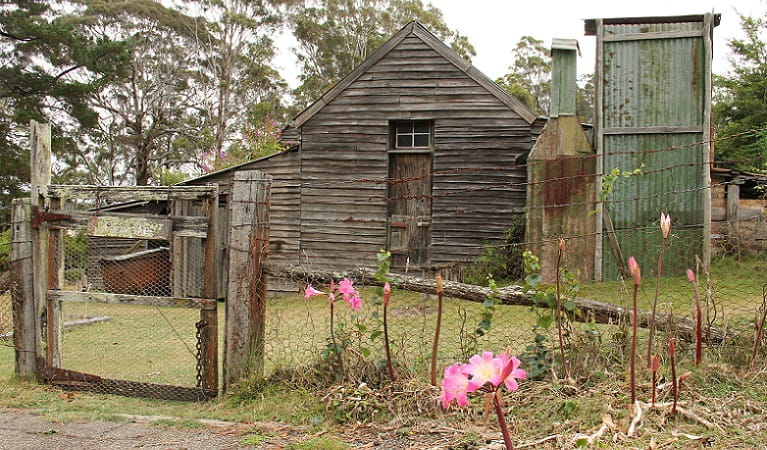
Davidson Whaling Station in Kiah Inlet, Twofold Bay, Eden, NSW.

Alexander Davidson was a Scottish immigrant who began shore-based whaling in 1857 with his son John. Their whaling station in Kiah Inlet was first built in the 1860s and was the longest running shore-based whaling station in Australia. The family utilized row boats and harpoons and did not advance with newer, more effective equipment, such as hand guns and motor boats. They indicated this was to protect the orcas from loud sounds and also to not scare them away. The three generations of the Davidson family all claimed to have Old Tom assisting them on their whaling trips. They reported that Old Tom would take the cable attached to the harpoon to pull the rowboat faster out to the open ocean. The relationship between orcas and the Davidson family was based on mutual help: if a man would fall overboard during one of the whaling trips, the orcas would protect the man from danger until he was back on board. Similarly, if any orcas became entangled in fishing lines, a whaler would cut them free. Indigenous Australian men were employed in the Davidson whaling crew, which is one factor that kept the Davidson whaling station going for so long. They were employed on the same terms as whites, which is one of the reasons the relationship between the orcas and the Davidson whalers was established.

George Davidson's was the only relationship that mirrored the depth of the bond between Indigenous Australian workers and the orcas. This bond might have been established due to the whalers of the crew feeding Old Tom and other orcas fish while waiting for passing whales. In later years, this was one of the main food sources for the orcas. George died in 1952.

=== The Law of Tongue ===
The Law of Tongue was recognized as the "unspoken rule" between the Eden orcas and humans. This law refers to the process of whalers anchoring the whale carcass to either the bottom of the sea floor or in proximity to the shore, where the orcas feed on the carcass. The primary target of the orcas on most species of whales, specifically the baleen whales, are the tongue, the lips and the genital region. The blubber and bones remain unharmed and are then used by the whalers.

The law of tongue dates back to indigenous Australian history, similarly to the food offering to the beowas by locals for generations.

== Life ==
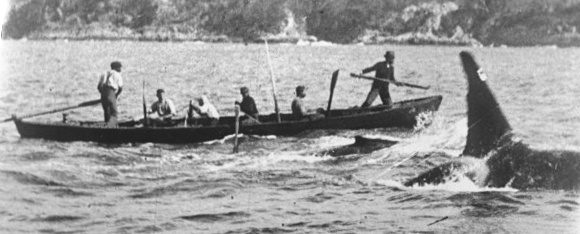
Old Tom swims alongside a whaling boat, flanking a whale calf: The boat is being towed by a harpooned whale (not visible here).

According to Davidson family history, Old Tom was known to them for 80 years and was present for the baleen whale migration seasons from the 1860s until his death in September 1930. Old Tom measured 6.7 m (22 ft), with a 1.02 m (3 ft 4 in) skull and 13.4 cm (5.3 in) long teeth, weighing 6 tons. He was distinguishable by his long dorsal fin which had a bend at the top to the right. The Davidson family history indicated Old Tom had a distinct "sense of humor", as the name Tom appears to have originated from the word "tomfoolery", and his early nickname "Tom the Humorist" is mentioned in Davidson family diaries and oral histories. The Davidson family described Tom as an "athletic and skillful whale hunter", who would commonly be seen towing smaller fishing boats by their anchor line. There has been some debate regarding Old Tom's sex and his position in the pod. Most orca pods are matrilineal, consisting of the mother and her immediate family; the mother is normally the leader of the pod. However, photographs reveal his male genitalia and his large dorsal fin is a trait of male orcas.

Old Tom and his pod returned every winter during the migration seasons of baleen whales, from late May until early September. His pod consisted of 20–30 orcas. While the exact number of orcas in the pod is unknown, 21 were known by name, identified by their differences in dorsal fins: Stranger, Jackson, Hooky, Humpy, Cooper, Typee, Big Ben, Young Ben, Kinscher, Jimmy, Sharkey, Charlie Adgery, Brierly, Albert, Youngster, Walker, Big Jack, Little Jack, Skinner, and Montague. Many of the names were derived from deceased Aboriginal whalers. The orcas in Twofold Bay would also feed on seals and dolphins.

=== Hunting methods ===
Orcas utilize distraction shading and countershading as camouflage, as their distinctly contrasting and sharp edged markings visually break up their outlines making it difficult for panicked prey to easily determine their direction and orientation. When hunting baleen whales, which range from 15 to 30 metres (49 to 98 ft) in size, the pod would divide into three groups. One group stayed in the open ocean, hindering escape, the second swam underneath the baleen whale to prevent it from diving deep, and the third attacked the whale. Attacks consisted of biting at the lips and fins, in addition to leaping on to the blowhole to drown the whale. After the whale was trapped in the bay, Old Tom would usually swim in front of the Davidson whaling station and perform "flop-tailing" to get the attention of the onshore whalers. Flop tailing describes the act of a whale slapping its tail on the water's surface. The sound of flop-tailing was followed by yells of "Rusho" on land, calling whalers to go out to sea. The whalers would then row out and harpoon the baleen whale.

In the open ocean, orcas would distinguish the green row boats of the Davidson family from the other white boats of competitors, and herd the baleen whales towards them.

=== End of Eden whaling ===
Whaling in Eden declined after the death of Typee in 1901, who was killed by a local after stranding close to shore. This led the Indigenous Australian whalers to abandon Davidson's crew and Kiah Inlet. The shortage in workforce was matched by alternatives to whale oil and by a decline in orcas and baleen whales due to increased modern ship-based whaling. No baleen whales were spotted in Eden after 1926, though Old Tom returned alone yearly until his death. Orcas are sociable and rarely seen alone. The return of Old Tom alone to Twofold Bay has been interpreted as him returning to familiarity after losing the rest of his pod: locals believe the rest of Old Tom's pod was killed further north in Jervis bay by Norwegian whalers, unaware of the relationship between these orcas and the whalers. Fishermen and whalers often regarded orcas as competitors and retaliated with bullets and harpoons. Additionally, a study published in October 2023 by Isabella Reeves et al., of Old Tom's genome and comparisons of his DNA to other orcas across the world suggests that neither Old Tom nor any of his pod left any confirmed descendants, suggesting that Eden's orcas were rendered locally extinct. However, possibilities remain that at least some relatives to Old Tom and his pod remain in populations not sampled in the study.

=== Death ===
Old Tom was found dead on 17 September 1930 by George Davidson in the southern part of Twofold Bay. The cause of death was unknown; however experts believe that Old Tom died of his age and/or starvation. Orcas commonly die of starvation due to worn-down teeth.

It was recounted on video interview by documentarian Greg McKee that the eyewitness Margaret Brooks, daughter of Davidson's Neighbour, John R Logan who in the 1920s typically towed the whaleboats out to chases in his motor launch "the White Heather", on one occasion after a whale chase fought Old Tom for the carcass of a whale, ending with a tug of war with the White Heather dislodging some of Old Tom's teeth. Logan was said by his daughter to have felt guilty for this incident and this later prompted him to pay for the preservation of Tom's Skeleton and fund a small museum for its protection, eventually evolving to the present Eden Killer whale Museum.

== Legacy ==
Old Tom's age has been the subject of debate. Determining the exact age of orcas in the wild was not possible until the 21st century. The cross-section of the teeth is often used to determine the age, similar to how the rings in the tree trunks are used to determine the tree's age. According to researchers in 1977, Old Tom's age was stated to be around 35 years old at the time of his death. However, three generations of Davidson family whalers claim to have whaled with assistance of Old Tom since the 1860s. Old Tom's fascination with mooring lines and towing boats into the open ocean, reflected by the half-circular pattern on his teeth, is documented in the Eden Killer Whale Museum. By the late 1800s, the study of orca teeth was documented more widely. Scientists determined that orca teeth naturally wear down over the span of their lifetime, resulting in exposed pulp cavities and abscesses.

The Killer Whale Museum was established in 1931. Beyond the permanent exhibitions of the history of Eden and Old Tom, there are travelling exhibitions. The main attraction of the museum is the preserved skeleton of Old Tom. The museum is located on the northern side of Twofold Bay and is visited by 50,000 people annually. The original Davidson whaling station in Kiah Inlet is accessible to view as well.

Filmmaker George McKee produced an ABC documentary, "Killers in Eden", in 2004 based on the story of the Davidsons, Old Tom and his pod.

== See also ==
- Killer whales of Eden, Australia
- List of individual cetaceans
