= Killer whales of Eden, New South Wales =

Group of killer whales in Australia

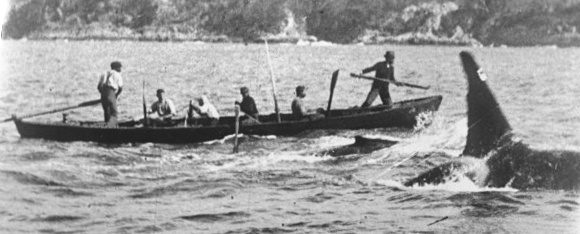
The killer whale known as Old Tom swims alongside a whaleboat, flanking a whale calf. The boat is being towed by a harpooned whale (not visible here).

The killers of Eden or Twofold Bay killers were a group of killer whales (Orcinus orca) known for their co-operation with human whalers. They were seen near the port of Eden in southeastern Australia between 1840 and 1930. A pod of killer whales, which included amongst its members a distinctive male called Old Tom, would assist whalers in hunting baleen whales. The killer whales would find target whales, shepherd them into Twofold Bay or neighbouring regions of coast, and then often swim many kilometres away from the location of the hunt to alert the whalers at their cottage to their presence and often help to kill the whales.

== Indigenous Australians ==
The local indigenous people, the Yuin tribe, believed the killer whales to be their totem animal and reincarnations of their ancestors. Yuin elder Guboo Ted Thomas heard stories of his grandfather riding on the backs of killer whales. Thomas and his daughter Lynne describe Yuin cooperating with dolphins (cetaceans, like killer whales) to drive fish to shore where they could be speared. Local historian Barry Smith speculates that the black-and-white ceremonial dress of Koori warriors is based on the killer whale.

Documentarian Greg McKee has been told by Yuin elders that Aboriginal Australians had a spiritual association with whales effectively dating back to the last ice age. Long ago their ancestors used to hunt game in areas of dry land presently covered by sea. These ancestors took on the form of killer whales and so continued to hunt in their traditional hunting grounds. The references to dry land now covered by sea suggests the last ice ages when the sea level was lower than present more than 10,000 years ago. A short selection of video interviews with various aboriginal Eden whaler descendants including at a gathering on location at the Davidson Whaling station can be viewed online

While collaborative hunting associations between dolphins and humans occur in many traditional fishing communities, they are rare between killer whales and humans, and particularly Western cultures. Zoologist and historian Danielle Clode describes how the pre-existing cultural and spiritual connection between the Yuin people and the killer whales of Twofold Bay allowed the unique collaboration between European whalers and killer whales to develop because Indigenous crew on the whale boats refused to allow killer whales to be harmed or killed during whale hunts. Clode's book, Killers in Eden, documented the historical accounts for this association including observations recorded by early whaling station manager Oswald Brierly, anthropologist Robert Hamilton Mathews and Yuin elder Percy Mumbulla.

== Davidson whalers and "the law of the tongue" ==
Old Tom's role was commonly to alert the human whalers to the presence of a baleen whale in the bay by breaching or tailslapping at the mouth of the Kiah River, which is one of the smallest rivers, where the Davidson family had their tiny cottages. This role endeared him to the whalers and led to the idea that he was "leader of the pack," although such a role was more likely taken by a little known female (as is typical among killer whales). The whale known as "Stranger" described as a leader of "stranger's mob" was a large 30-ft male.

After the harpooning, some of the killer whales would even grab the ropes in their teeth and aid the whalers in hauling. The skeleton of Old Tom is on display at the Eden Killer Whale Museum, and significant wear marks still exist on his teeth from repeatedly grabbing fast-moving ropes.

In return for their help, the whalers would anchor the carcass overnight while the killer whales ate the tongue and lips of the whale, then haul it ashore. The arrangement is a rare example of mutualism between humans and killer whales. The arrangement was called "the law of the tongue". The killer whales would also feed on the many fish and birds that would show up to pick at the smaller scraps and runoff from the fishing.

Many of the Eden killer whales were individually known and named, often after Yuin whalers who had died. Some of best known killer whales included Tom (who died 15 September 1930), Hooky, Humpy (died 1926/7), Cooper, Typee (died 1901), Jackson, Stranger, Big Ben, Young Ben, Kinscher (female), Jimmy, Sharkey, Charlie Adgery, Brierly, Albert, Youngster, Walker, Flukey, Big Jack, Little Jack, Skinner, and Montague. The probable structure and history of the pod during this period was reconstructed by zoologist Danielle Clode.

== End of whaling arrangement ==
Killer whales became less common in Twofold Bay after a stranded whale was stabbed to death on Asling Beach in 1901. Only seven members of the once 30 strong pod returned the following year, with only a few lone males, including Old Tom and Hooky, returning after that. An alternative theory is that the rest of the pod was killed by Norwegian whalers in Jervis Bay.

Around the mid-1920s, retired pastoralist John Logan, his young daughter Margaret and third-generation whaler George Davidson were aboard White Heather, Logan's motorised yacht, after a whale chase. The Logans were the Davidsons' closest neighbours and the White Heather was often used to tow whales and whaleboats back to the whaling station after a kill. Old Tom had earlier forced a small whale to the surface, where Davidson's crew had harpooned it. Because he believed the buoyed carcass would be lost to an approaching storm, Logan attempted to bring the carcass ashore without Old Tom eating the tongue and lips. Old Tom apparently grabbed the tow rope in his mouth and lost some teeth in the struggle, with Brooks recounting that Logan said "Oh God, what have I done?" when he realised that Old Tom had lost teeth.

When Old Tom's corpse washed ashore in 1930, the mouth had abscesses from missing teeth and he may have died of starvation. His death was reported in the 18 September 1930 issue of The Sydney Morning Herald as "King of the Killers".

Logan provided the premises for the Eden Killer Whale Museum, which still has Old Tom's skeleton, "partly out of guilt".

Three killer whale pods were observed during one week in 2010—roughly on the 80th anniversary of Old Tom's death.

== Documentation of the phenomenon ==
The unique behaviour of killer whales in the area was recorded in the 1840s by whaling overseer Sir Oswald Brierly in his extensive diaries. It was recorded in numerous publications over the period and witnesses included Australian members of Parliament. The behaviour was recorded on movie film in 1910 by C.B. Jenkins and C.E. Wellings and publicly projected in Sydney, although the film is now missing and believed to have been damaged in the 1930s when the bank vaults in which they were kept were flooded.

The story of the Davidson family and the killer whales was dramatised by Tom Mead in the book Killers of Eden.

In 2002, zoologist and science historian Danielle Clode wrote a nonfiction account of the story, which was made into an Australian Broadcasting Corporation documentary in 2004, Killers in Eden.

While co-operative hunting between humans and wild cetaceans exists in other parts of the world, the relationship between whalers and killer whales in Eden appears to be unique, despite the widespread co-occurrence of whalers and killer whales elsewhere.

The Eden killer whale pod is also commemorated in the Australian National Museum, with full sized models used as part of the display.
