= Ingrid Visser (biologist) =

New Zealand marine biologist

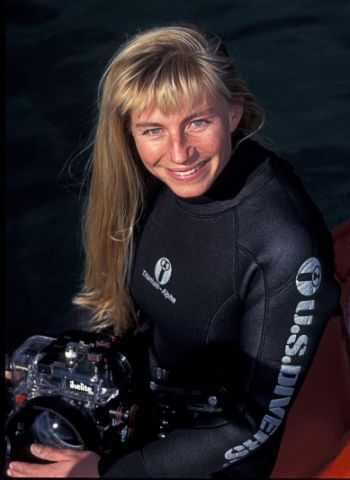
Ingrid Visser

Ingrid Natasha Visser (born 20 February 1966)is a New Zealand conservation activist and public figure known for campaigning on issues involving orcas and marine mammal protection. She is also a marine biologist with a PhD from the University of Auckland and founded the Orca Research Trust.

== Early life ==
Visser was born in Lower Hutt, Wellington, New Zealand. Her parents were Dutch immigrants who moved to New Zealand in the 1950s. They were both nationalised as New Zealanders after she was born.

Between June 1982 and November 1986, Visser sailed with her parents and sister aboard a 17-metre (56 ft) yacht around the world. The trip covered over 50,000 nautical miles (93,000 km) and visited more than 40 countries.

== Education ==
Visser holds three university degrees: a Bachelor of Science (Massey University), a Masters of Science, and a Doctorate of Philosophy (both the University of Auckland). Visser has been working with orca (Orcinus orca, also known as killer whales) since 1992 and completed her PhD in 2000, the first scientific study of orca in New Zealand waters.

== Scientific work ==
Visser's team with wild orca

Her research on orca has been published in international scientific journals, since 1998, and many of these publications are available on the Orca Research Trust website.

In 2002 Visser's research was instrumental in the New Zealand Government's reclassification of New Zealand orcas from "Common" in the New Zealand Threat Classification System to "Nationally Critical". This is the equivalent status of "Critically Endangered" in the internationally recognised IUCN Red Data listing.

While her earlier research focused on New Zealand orca populations, her more recent work has included expedition-based guiding and lecturing.

Although some of her publications are recent, they have included analyses of data and observations collected during earlier field studies. Her most recent publication on New Zealand Orca was based on data collected in 2014

Publicly available DOC records identify marine-mammal permits held by Visser, including a permit for leopard-seal research recorded as active from 2018 to 2028.However, the current status and expiry date of the separate permit or authorisation associated with her New Zealand orca research are not clear from the publicly available records located.

Visser’s research methods and professional conduct have also attracted criticism.Her practice of habituating wild orca and engaging in close interactions with them has raised concerns about whether her presence may influence the animals’ behaviour and affect the objectivity of behavioural observations.Some of her public claims are based on personal observations, photographs, or unpublished data, which can make independent assessment and replication difficult.

In a separate resource-consent process, marine scientist David Clement noted that a species-status table submitted by Visser relied on older conservation references than those used in his assessment, resulting in differences between the two evaluations. Her work also encompasses advocacy publications, conference posters, expert reports, and legal submissions in addition to peer-reviewed scientific research.

== Publications ==
She has published numerous popular articles and her photographs have appeared in magazines such as National Geographic, BBC Wildlife, New Zealand Geographic, and An Encyclopedia of New Zealand.

Visser has set up the Orca Research Trust, the Antarctic Killer Whale Identification Catalogue.

Visser has written an autobiography, Swimming with Orca, which was a finalist in the Environmental category of the New Zealand Montana Book Awards, and two children's books (I Love Killer Whales and The Orca). The latter has been translated into Māori and is currently in press as a bilingual English/Spanish publication.

== Selected publications ==
- Orca (Orcinus orca) in New Zealand waters (Ph.D. Dissertation).
- Antarctic peninsula killer whales (Orcinus orca) hunt seals and a penguin on floating ice. Marine Mammal Science.
- Cookie Cutter Shark (Isistius sp.) Bites on Cetaceans, with Particular Reference to Killer Whales (Orca) (Orcinus orca). Aquatic Mammals.
- Stranding, resighting, and boat strike of a killer whale (Orcinus orca) off New Zealand. Aquatic Mammals.

== Other work ==
Visser is a member of the Australia & New Zealand branch of The Explorers Club and continues to travel the world in search of orca. She published the first manuscript on Papua New Guinea orca, and returns regularly to Walindi Plantation Resort to conduct field research there.

She serves as Chair of the Free Morgan Foundation, an organization involved in efforts to free captive orca Morgan in Europe, and has appeared in court in relation to those efforts.

In September 2010, she co-founded Whale Rescue, an organisation of volunteers who provide logistical and practical expertise and equipment for rescuing cetaceans.

In June 2017, she served as a witness to a Senate committee on Fisheries and Oceans in the Senate of Canada in favour of Bill S-203, which would make it illegal to keep cetaceans and whales in captivity in Canada.

Visser has been involved in the rescue and attempted rehabilitation of stranded orca calves in New Zealand. In 2016, she participated in the response to a young orca calf, known as “Bob” or “Tama”, in Tauranga Harbour. In 2021, Visser was also involved in the care of Toa, an unweaned orca calf stranded near Plimmerton.

Her handling of both cases attracted scrutiny, particularly over the decision to hold the calves in human care and the extent to which the interventions aligned with advice from the Department of Conservation (DOC). In the Tauranga case, DOC records indicated that the intervention differed from the department’s traditional approach to marine-mammal strandings. In the case of Toa, DOC considered euthanasia among the possible options, while Visser advocated continued rehabilitation and attempts to reunite the calf with its pod. Critics have questioned whether the interventions were appropriately justified and managed, particularly given that both calves died while in human care.

== Documentaries ==
Visser has appeared in and contributed to documentaries featuring her research with orcas. IMDb lists some of her work:

- Discovery Channel's "The Orca: Killers I have Known" (1997)
- Animal Planet's "Untamed & Uncut: Killer Whales Attack a Seal"
- PBS and Jean-Michel Cousteau's award-winning "Call of the Killer Whale" (2009)
- BBC Two's "The Woman Who Swims With Killer Whales" (2011–2012)
- Robert Marc Lehmann "0800 See Orca" (2022)
