= List of ship launches in 1859 =

The list of ship launches in 1859 is a chronological list of ships launched in 1859.

Date	Ship	Class	Builder	Location	Country	Notes
3 January	Queen of India	Barque	Cunningham	Newcastle upon Tyne	United Kingdom	For W. R. Crawford.
4 January	Dundee	Barque	Adamson	Alloa	United Kingdom	For private owner.
4 January	Esk	Steamship	Messrs. Smith & Rodgers	Glasgow	United Kingdom	For Old Shipping Co, or London and Edinburgh Shipping Co.
4 January	Sea Horse	Barque	Messrs. Robert Steele & Co.	Greenock	United Kingdom	For Mr. Lamont.
5 January	Lady Cecilia	East Indiaman	Adamson	Willington	United Kingdom	For W. R. Crawford.
5 January	Newcastle	Full-rigged ship	W. Pile Jr.	Sunderland	United Kingdom	For R. Green.
6 January	Falcon	Full-rigged ship	Messrs. Robert Steele & Co.	Greenock	United Kingdom	For private owner.
8 January	Jane Jackson	Schooner	Atkinson & Thompson	Knottingley	United Kingdom	For Morris & Jackson.
8 January	Mary Magdalen	Brig	Robert Jones	Foryd	United Kingdom	For Gladstone, Oldha & Co.
8 January	Oçeola	Full-rigged ship	E. J. Harland & Co.	Belfast	United Kingdom	For private owner.
8 January	Osiola	Full-rigged ship	Messrs. Hickson & Co.	Belfast	United Kingdom	For private owner.
8 January	Stephanie	Corvette	Messrs. R. & H. Green	Blackwall	United Kingdom	For Portuguese Navy.
17 January	Bitchok	Tug	Archibald Denny	Dumbarton	United Kingdom	For private owner.
19 January	Moses Parry	Schooner	Mr. Ellis	Portinllaen	United Kingdom	For Mr. Parry and others.
19 January	Wyoming	Sloop-of-war		Philadelphia Navy Yard	United States	For United States Navy.
20 January	Botassis	Steamship	Messrs. John Pile & Co.	West Hartlepool	United Kingdom	For Greek and Oriental Steam Navigation Co.
20 January	Jessie Beazley	Clipper	Messrs. Clover & Royle	Birkenhead	United Kingdom	For James Beazley.
20 January	Macduff	Full-rigged ship	Messrs. Hall	Aberdeen	United Kingdom	For Isaac Cruickshank.
20 January	Sir John Lawrence	Clipper	Messrs. Thomas Royden & Sons	Liverpool	United Kingdom	For Messrs. Farnworth & Jardine.
20 January	Slieve Donard	East Indiaman	Messrs. Thomas Vernon & Son	Liverpool	United Kingdom	For Messrs. William Sinclair & Son.
20 January	Summer Cloud	Clipper	Messrs. John Pile & Co.	West Hartlepool	United Kingdom	For William Sabbiston.
21 January	Star of the Sea	Cutter	Stephen Walsh	Ringsend	United Kingdom	For private owner.
22 January	Old Tom	Clipper	Belfast Ship Building Co.	Belfast	United Kingdom	For private owner.
January	Anne Jane	Schooner			United Kingdom	For private owner.
January	Eglantine	Merchantman	Forsyth	South Shields	United Kingdom	For Robert Wright.
January	Matilda	Brig		Ipswich	United Kingdom	For private owner.
January	Stanley	Steamship	Messrs. John Pile & Co.	West Hartlepool	United Kingdom	For private owner.
Unknown date	Zebra	Steamship	Brownlow & Lumsden	Hull	United Kingdom	For William B. Brownlow and others.
3 February	Lady Melville	Full-rigged ship	J. Haswell	Sunderland	United Kingdom	For J. Hay.
3 February	Merry Monarch	Barque	J. T. Alcock	Sunderland	United Kingdom	For J. G. Hill.
3 February	Naomi	Full-rigged ship	G. Peverall	Pallion	United Kingdom	For Mr. Vickermann.
3 February	Regalia	Brig	S. P. Austin	Sunderland	United Kingdom	For Messrs. Fullerton & Ridley.
3 February	Not named	Schooner	Messrs. Hodgson & Gardner	North Hylton	United Kingdom	Subsequently sold to Colverson & Co., and named Two Emmas.
5 February	Conway's Pride	Smack	Messrs. John Hyde & Jones	Conwy	United Kingdom	For private owner.
5 February	Kurrachee	Steamship	Messrs. Blackwood & Gordon	Cartvale	United Kingdom	For Bombay Steam Navigation Company.
5 February	Snowdrop	Schooner	Messrs. Bayley & Sons	Ipswich	United Kingdom	For private owner.
8 February	Bohemian	Steamship	Messrs. William Denny & Bros.	Dumbarton	United Kingdom	For Montreal Ocean Steamship Company.
15 February	Gunboat No. 3	Gunboat		Charleston Navy Yard	United States	For United States Navy.
15 February	Mohican	Sloop-of-war		Portsmouth Navy Yard	United States	For United States Navy.
15 February	Narragansett	Sloop-of-war		Boston Navy Yard	United States	For United States Navy.
16 February	Arctic	Steamship	Messrs. Charles & William Earle	Hull	United Kingdom	For Messrs. Thomas Wilson, Sons, & Co.
17 February	Asterope	Clipper	Messrs. A. Hall & Co.	Aberdeen	United Kingdom	For Alex Dunn.
17 February	The Dublin Lass	Schooner	Messrs. Smith & Scallen	Ringsend	United Kingdom	For private owner.
18 February	Blue Jacket	Schooner	Messrs. Parry & Co	Hirael	United Kingdom	For private owner.
19 February	Ocean Spray	Yorkshire Billyboy	George Hill	Barton upon Humber	United Kingdom	For Robert Chapman.
19 February	Reina Blanca	Petronila-class screw frigate	Reales Astilleros de Esteiro	Ferrol	Spain	For Spanish Navy.
19 February	Sea Nymph	Brig	G. Lungley	Northam	United Kingdom	For private owner.
19 February	Yorkshire	Clipper	Messrs. Money, Wigram & Co	Blackwall	United Kingdom	For Australian Line of Clippers.
21 February	Aurora	Fishing smack	Alex Connell	Belfast	United Kingdom	For private owner.
21 February	Indian Queen	Steamship	Messrs. Neilson & Sons	Whiteinch	United Kingdom	For private owner.
February	Frela	Steamship	Caird & Co.	Greenock	United Kingdom	For private owner.
February	Wild Wave	Yacht	Surridge & Hartnell	Limehouse	United Kingdom	For R. Sadleir.
2 March	Mary Scott	Merchantman	G. Booth	Sunderland	United Kingdom	For Messrs. Scott, & Co.
3 March	Toucey	Sloop-of-war		Mare Island Navy Yard	United States	For United States Navy.
5 March	Aalborg	Paddle steamer	Messrs. Caird & Co.	Greenock	United Kingdom	For H. B. Prior.
10 March	Canonnière Nº 1	Nº 1-class Canonnière	Forges et Chantiers de la Méditerranée	La Seyne	France	For French Navy
19 March	Empress of India	Full-rigged ship	Messrs. Batchelor Bros.	Cardiff	United Kingdom	For W. Nicol.
19 March	Shannon	Steamship	Messrs. R. Napier & Sons	Govan	United Kingdom	For Royal Mail Steam Packet Company.
21 March	Highland Lass	Schooner	Messrs. R. & D. Ross	Inverkeithing	United Kingdom	For private owners.
23 March	Dacotah	Sloop-of-war		Norfolk Navy Yard	United States	For United States Navy.
25 March	Ezra Nye	Pilot boat	Wells & Webb	New York	United Kingdom	For New Jersey Pilots.
26 March	Monge	Aviso	Arsenal de Brest	Brest	France	For French Navy.
March	Lord Muncaster	Schooner	William Ashburner	Barrow-in-Furness	United Kingdom	For Mr. Charnley.
March	Nanhoron	Brigantine	Robert Thomas	Nevin	United Kingdom	For private owner.
April	Canonnière Nº 2	Nº 1-class Canonnière	Forges et Chantiers de la Méditerranée	La Seyne	France	For French Navy
5 April	Jane Elizabeth	Schooner	Owen Williams	Hirael	United Kingdom	For Mr. Williams.
6 April	The Taptee	Steamship	Messrs. Blackwood & Gordon	Paisley	United Kingdom	For Matthew Hodgart.
10 April	Canonnière Nº 3	Nº 1-class Canonnière	Forges et Chantiers de la Méditerranée	La Seyne	France	For French Navy
12 April	Iroquois	Mohican-class sloop		New York Navy Yard	United States	For United States Navy.
16 April	Revenber	Renown-class ship of the line		Pembroke Dockyard	United Kingdom	For Royal Navy.
16 April	Sally Gale	Snow	Green & Richardson	Sunderland	United Kingdom	For Brooks & Co.
16 April	Talca	Barque	Messrs. Cato & Miller	Liverpool	United Kingdom	For private owner.
18 April	Maid o' the Mist	Schooner	William Read	Ipswich	United Kingdom	For Mr. Pater.
18 April	Star	Cutter	William Camper	Gosport	United Kingdom	For private owner.
20 April	Canonnière Nº 4	Nº 1-class Canonnière	Forges et Chantiers de la Méditerranée	La Seyne	France	For French Navy
20 April	Canonnière Nº 5	Nº 1-class Canonnière	Forges et Chantiers de la Méditerranée	La Seyne	France	For French Navy
22 April	Charlotte	Schooner	Messrs. Roberts	Rhuddlan	United Kingdom	For private owner.
3 May	Immacolata Concezione	Corvette, or royal yacht	Thames Ironworks and Shipbuilding Company	Blackwall	United Kingdom	For Papal Navy, or Pope Pius IX.
April	W. W. Scott	Brig		Quebec	(United Kingdom of Great Britain and Ireland) Province of Canada	For private owner.
3 May	Quadrant	Steamship	Thames Ironworks and Shipbuilding Company	Blackwall	United Kingdom	For Imperial Russian Government.
4 May	Hood	Second rate		Chatham Dockyard	United Kingdom	For Royal Navy.
4 May	Forbin	1st class Aviso	Arsenal de Brest	Brest	France	For French Navy
5 May	Bates Family	Full-rigged ship	Messrs. Samuelson	Hull	United Kingdom	For Edward Bates.
5 May	The Alpine	Merchantman	Messrs. Denny & Rankin	Dumbarton	United Kingdom	For private owner.
5 May	Windsor Castle	Paddle steamer	Messrs. Caird	Cartsdyke	United Kingdom	For private owner.
18 May	Lamotte-Picquet	Lamotte-Picquet-class 1st Class Aviso	Arsenal de Cherbourg	Cherbourg	France	For French Navy
18 May	Sarah	Merchantman	Mr. Geddes Sr.	River Spey	United Kingdom	For Messrs. George Noble & Sons.
20 May	Loreley	Paddle aviso	Königliche Werft	Danzig	Prussia	For Prussian Navy.
26 May	D'Estaing	D'Estaing-class 1st Class Aviso	Arsenal de Toulon	Toulon	France	For French Navy
30 May	Bougainville	1st Class Aviso	Arsenal de Lorient	Lorient	France	For French Navy
31 May	Patriot	Schooner	D. Richards	Portmadoc	United Kingdom	For D. Richards.
May	Carnatic	Clipper	Messrs. Alexander Stephen & Sons	Kelvinhaugh	United Kingdom	For private owner.
May	Clio	Yacht	Wachill	Poole	United Kingdom	For private owner.
May	Exeter	Fishing boat	Messrs. Nicholson & Sons	Greenock	United Kingdom	For Society for the Relief and Encouragement of the Fishermen in the Highlands and Islands of Scotland.
May	Lizzie King	Fishing boat	Messrs. Nicholson & Sons	Greenock	United Kingdom	For Society for the Relief and Encouragement of the Fishermen in the Highlands and Islands of Scotland.
June	Canonnière Nº 6	Nº 1-class Canonnière	Forges et Chantiers de la Méditerranée	La Seyne	France	For French Navy
June	Canonnière Nº 7	Nº 1-class Canonnière	Forges et Chantiers de la Méditerranée	La Seyne	France	For French Navy
June	Canonnière Nº 8	Nº 1-class Canonnière	Forges et Chantiers de la Méditerranée	La Seyne	France	For French Navy
June	Canonnière Nº 9	Nº 1-class Canonnière	Forges et Chantiers de la Méditerranée	La Seyne	France	For French Navy
1 June	Charybdis	Pearl-class corvette		Chatham Dockyard	United Kingdom	For Royal Navy.
1 June	Greyhound	Greyhound-class sloop		Pembroke Dockyard	United Kingdom	For Royal Navy.
2 June	Grampus	Brigantine	Messrs. Roberts & Sons	Hirael	United Kingdom	For private owner.
2 June	Seine	Paddle steamer	Thames Ironworks and Shipbuilding Company	Blackwall	United Kingdom	For Royal West India Mail Company.
4 June	Coëtlogon	Lamotte-Picquet-class 1st Class Aviso	Arsenal de Cherbourg	Cherbourg	France	For French Navy
4 June	Ariadne	Ariadne-class frigate		Deptford Dockyard	United Kingdom	For Royal Navy.
4 June	Galatea	Yacht	Messrs. Willmett	Bristol	United Kingdom	For Henry Crawshay.
4 June	Paragacu	Paddle steamer	Messrs. Richardson & Duck	Stockton-on-Tees	United Kingdom	For private owner.
5 June	Buenaventura	Paddle steamer	J. Hodgson	Marsh End	United Kingdom	For private owner.
11 June	City of Exeter	Steamship		Jarrow	United Kingdom	For private owner.
14 June	Orion	Paddle steamer	Messrs. Caird & Co.	Greenock	United Kingdom	For Petersburg and Lübeck Steam Navigation Company.
18 June	Sirius	Paddle steamer	Messrs. Caird & Co.	Greenock	United Kingdom	For private owner.
25 June	De Soto	Paddle steamer	Lawrence & Foulks	New York	United States	For Livingston, Crocheron & Co.
25 June	Seminole	Sloop-of-war		Pensacola Navy Yard	United States	For United States Navy.
30 June	Venetian	Cargo ship	Harland & Wolff	Belfast	United Kingdom	For Messrs. John Bibby, Sons, and Co.
June	Haidée	Yacht	Hatcher		United Kingdom	For T. Bartlett.
June	J. L. Hall	Steamship		South Shields	United Kingdom	For private owner.
June	Leven	Brig		Quebec	(United Kingdom of Great Britain and Ireland) Province of Canada	For private owner.
1 July	Kadie	Steamship	Archibald Denny	Dumbarton	United Kingdom	For private owner.
1 July	Spirit of the Day	Barque	Messrs. M'Laine	Belfast	United Kingdom	For private owner.
2 July	Albatross	Yacht	Messrs. Peto, Brassey & Co.	Birkenhead	United Kingdom	For Thomas Brassey Jr.
2 July	General Caulfield	East Indiaman	Messrs. T. & W. Smith	North Shields	United Kingdom	For Messrs. T.& W. Smith.
2 July	Jane Henderson	Full-rigged ship	Messrs. Scott & Sons	Greenock	United Kingdom	For Messrs. Henderson & Galbraith.
2 July	Japan	Clipper	M'Millan	Dumbarton	United Kingdom	For private owner.
2 July	Menaos	Paddle steamer	John Laird	Birkenhead	United Kingdom	For Amazon Steam Navigation Company.
2 July	Stanley	Brigantine	Johnson	Bideford	United Kingdom	For private owner.
2 July	Thistle	Steamship	Laurence Hill & Co.	Port Glasgow	United Kingdom	For Glasgow & Londonderry Steam Packet Co.
3 July	Delta	Paddle steamer	Thames Ironworks and Shipbuilding Company	Blackwall	United Kingdom	For Peninsular and Oriental Steam Navigation Company.
4 July	James Schollick	Merchantman	E. J. Schollick	Ulverston	United Kingdom	For private owner.
5 July	Ada Letitia	Schooner	Evans	Sea Banks	United Kingdom	For private owner.
15 July	Wressel Castle	Barque	William Petrie	Sunderland	United Kingdom	For Banks & Co.
16 July	Enterprise	Paddle steamer	Messrs. R. M. Lawrence & Co., Liverpool	Ullswater	United Kingdom	For private owner.
16 July	Not named	Full-rigged ship	Messrs. A. Duthie & Co.	Aberdeen	United Kingdom	Speculative build.
20 July	Celerity	Steamship	William Denny and Brothers	Dumbarton	United Kingdom	For Indian Government.
27 July	Diligence	Yawl	Robert Skelton	Scarborough	United Kingdom	For Messrs. Woodhouse & Co.
28 July	Kidgeree	Brig	Messrs. Robert Napier & Sons	Govan	United Kingdom	For East Indian Government.
29 July	Wabeno	Full-rigged ship	Messrs. W. J. Fraser & Co.	Saint John	(United Kingdom of Great Britain and Ireland) Colony of New Brunswick	For private owner.
30 July	Bacchante	Liffey-class frigate		Pembroke Dockyard	United Kingdom	For Royal Navy.
30 July	Mutine	Greyhound-class sloop		Deptford Dockyard	United Kingdom	For Royal Navy.
30 July	Saint Bede	Barque	Bowman and Drummond	Blyth	United Kingdom	For Mease & Co.
31 July	Emma	Schooner	Messrs. Andrews Bros.	Lowestoft	United Kingdom	For private owner.
July	Ocean Guide	Schooner	Richardson	Brixham	United Kingdom	For private owner.
July	Wenonah	Full-rigged ship	Parsons	Miramichi	(United Kingdom of Great Britain and Ireland) Colony of New Brunswick	For private owner.
August	Canonnière Nº 10	Nº 1-class Canonnière	Forges et Chantiers de la Méditerranée	La Seyne	France	For French Navy
1 August	Finistère	Transport ship		Rochefort	France	For French Navy.
1 August	Prince Alfred	Merchantman	Mr. Kelly	Dartmouth	United Kingdom	For private owner.
2 August	Heatherbell	Barque	Edward Ellis	Garth	United Kingdom	For Mr. Thomas and others.
2 August	St. German's	Schooner	Watter	Bideford	United Kingdom	For private owner.
13 August	Olinda	Barque	Messrs. Steele & Co.	Greenock	United Kingdom	For Messrs. Ker & McBride.
15 August	Pensacola	Steamship		Pensacola Navy Yard	United States	For United States Navy.
25 August	The Innisfail	Brig	Dublin Dockyard Company	Ringsend	United Kingdom	For private owner.
29 August	Fanny Maud	Full-rigged ship	Messrs. Taylerson & Sons	Greenock	United Kingdom	For Messrs. Stewart & Co.
29 August	Jan Mayen	Whaler	Francis Robertson	Peterhead	United Kingdom	For Baillie Morrison and others.
29 August	Ocean King	Barque	James Laing	Sunderland	United Kingdom	For Mr. Swainston.
30 August	Flying Cloud	Merchantman	Johnson	Bideford	United Kingdom	For Mr. Mills.
30 August	John James	Coaster	Messrs. McAllum, Ferguson & Baird	Flint	United Kingdom	For David Jones.
31 August	Price Jones	Coaster	Messrs. McAllum, Ferguson & Baird	Flint	United Kingdom	For David Jones.
31 August	Rangitira	Steamship	Messrs. J. & G. Thomson	Govan	United Kingdom	For Australasian Steam Navigation Company.
August	Echo	Barque	G. Peverall	Sunderland	United Kingdom	For W. Langton.
August	Henrietta	Brig	Messrs. Barclay & Curle	Glasgow	United Kingdom	For private owner.
1 September	The Indian Queen	Merchantman	Foster	Emsworth	United Kingdom	For Mr. Foster.
2 September	Aube	Transport ship		Rochefort	France	For French Navy.
14 September	Galatea	Jason-class corvette		Woolwich Dockyard	United Kingdom	For Royal Navy.
27 September	Cygnet	Fishing smack	Messrs. Gibson & Butcher	Fleetwood	United Kingdom	For private owner.
28 September	Arracan	Merchantman		Kidderpore	(United Kingdom of Great Britain and Ireland) India	For private owner.
28 September	Mary Lord	Barque	W. Clibbett	Appledore	United Kingdom	For Messrs. Fox, Bromham & Co.
September	Myrtle	Brig		Wallace	(United Kingdom of Great Britain and Ireland) Colony of Nova Scotia	For private owner
6 October	The Prince Consort	Paddle steamer	John Scott Russell	Millwall	United Kingdom	For Ryde Steam Packet Company.
8 October	Pawnee	Sloop-of-War		Philadelphia Navy Yard	United States	For United States Navy.
13 October	Aconcagua	Barque	Josiah Jones	Liverpool	United Kingdom	For Messrs. Gardner & Broomhall and Messrs. Graham, Koely & Co.
13 October	City of Nanking	Full-rigged ship	Messrs. Barclay, Curle & Co.	Partick	United Kingdom	For Messrs. George Smity & Sons.
13 October	Lizzy	Sloop	Messrs. Wray & Son	Burton Stather	United Kingdom	For Kemp Taylor.
14 October	Monte Video	Paddle steamer	Messrs. Caird & Co.	Greenock	United Kingdom	For Saltena Company.
15 October	Topsey	Yacht	Campsey	Gosport	United Kingdom	For James Garratt.
26 October	Narcissus	Mersey-class frigate		Devonport Dockyard	United Kingdom	For Royal Navy.
27 October	Irresistible	Vanguard-class ship of the line		Chatham Dockyard	United Kingdom	For Royal Navy.
29 October	Prince of Orange	Steamship	Messrs. W. Simons & Co.	Whiteinch	United Kingdom	For private owner.
October	Alice	Fishing smack	John Richardson	Brixham	United Kingdom	For Lord John Scott.
October	Gardenia	Cutter		Belfast	United Kingdom	For R. F. Greville.
October	Queen Bee	Barque	James Briggs	Sunderland	United Kingdom	For Bradley & Co.
October	Sylphide	Yacht		Paris	France	For private owner.
October	Thames	Steamship		River Wear	United Kingdom	For private owner.
10 November	Jason	Jason-class corvette		Devonport Dockyard	United Kingdom	For Royal Navy.
12 November	Sicilian	Steamship	Harland & Wolff	Belfast	United Kingdom	For J. Bibby and Sons.
12 November	Victoria	First rate		Portsmouth Dockyard	United Kingdom	For Royal Navy.
24 November	Gloire	Gloire-class ironclad	Arsenal de Toulon	Toulon	France	For French Navy
26 November	Ranger	Philomel-class gunboat		Deptford Dockyard	United Kingdom	For Royal Navy.
27 November	The Astronomer	Full-rigged ship	Messrs. Vernon & Son	Liverpool	United Kingdom	For Mr. Harrison and others.
28 November	Fairy	Steamship	Woolwich London Steam Packet Company	Woolwich	United Kingdom	For private owner.
28 November	Virgen de Covadonga	Screw schooner	Arsenal de la Carraca	San Fernando	Spain	For Spanish Navy.
30 November	Gondola	Steam yacht	Jones, Quiggin & Co., Liverpool	Coniston Water	United Kingdom	For Furness Railway.
November	Prince of Orange	Paddle steamer	Messrs. Simons & Co.	Greenock	United Kingdom	For private owner.
9 December	Greenock	West Indiaman	M'Millan	Dumbarton	United Kingdom	For John Kerr.
10 December	Canadian	Passenger ship	Robert Steele & Co.	Greenock	United Kingdom	For Allan Line.
13 December	Cassard	1st class Aviso	Chantiers et Ateliers Augustin Normand	Le Havre	France	For French Navy
13 December	Duncan	Duncan-class ship of the line		Portsmouth Dockyard	United Kingdom	For Royal Navy.
13 December	The Shipwright	Cutter	Messrs. Smith & Scallan	Ringsend	United Kingdom	For private owner.
19 December	Gazelle	Arcona-class frigate	Königliche Werft	Danzig	Prussia	For Prussian Navy.
24 December	Astrée	Frigate	Arsenal de Lorient	Lorient	France	For French Navy.
27 December	John Penn	Steamship	Thames Ironworks and Shipbuilding Company	Blackwall	United Kingdom	For private owner.
28 December	Forfait	1st class Aviso	Chantiers et Ateliers Augustin Normand	Le Havre	France	For French Navy
December	Rob Roy	Brig			(United Kingdom of Great Britain and Ireland) Colony of Prince Edward Island	For private owner.
Summer	Admiral Kozakowitch	Sternwheeler		Nikolaieff	Russia	For private owner. Built in the United States and taken to Nikolaieff in sections for final assembly.
Summer	Johann	Clipper			United Kingdom	For private owner.
Autumn	Effort	Brigantine			(United Kingdom of Great Britain and Ireland) Colony of Nova Scotia	For private owner.
Unknown date	Ada Hancock	Tender			United States	For Phineas Banning.
Unknown date	Alchymist	Merchantman	R. Thompson	Sunderland	United Kingdom	For Burnett & Co.
Unknown date	Alwynton	Merchantman	R. T. Wilkinson	Sunderland	United Kingdom	For Mr. Wilkinson.
Unknown date	Ancient Mariner	Full-rigged ship	J. Barkes	Sunderland	United Kingdom	For E. T. Gourlay.
Unknown date	Ann	Merchantman	T. Lightfoot	Sunderland	United Kingdom	For W. Osborne.
Unknown date	Archimedes	Steamship		Pesth	Austrian Empire	For private owner.
Unknown date	Arizona	Paddle steamer	Harlan and Hollingsworth	Wilmington, Delaware	United States	For Southern Steamship Company.
Unknown date	Avon	Snow	Robert Pace	Sunderland	United Kingdom	For Rober H. Gayner et al.
Unknown date	Bayou City	Paddle steamer		Jeffersonville, Indiana	United States	For private owner.
Unknown date	Ben Nevis	Merchantman	W. Pickersgill	Sunderland	United Kingdom	For R. Turcan.
Unknown date	Blanch	Brig	Hobson & Gardner	North Hylton	United Kingdom	For Robert Hitching Bamfield.
Unknown date	Bravo	Full-rigged ship		Quebec	(United Kingdom of Great Britain and Ireland) Province of Canada	For private owner.
Unknown date	Breeze	Merchantman	G. Short	Sunderland	United Kingdom	For T. Reed.
Unknown date	Caleb Curtis	Pilot boat		Chelsea, Massachusetts	United States	For Boston & San Francisco Pilots.
Unknown date	Capiolani	Merchantman	Todd & Brown	Sunderland	United Kingdom	For Mr. Tweddell.
Unknown date	Carn Tual	Merchantman	T. R. Oswald	Sunderland	United Kingdom	For Sinclair & Co.
Unknown date	Cereal	Barque	Denniston & Pearson	Sunderland	United Kingdom	For R. Porrett.
Unknown date	Champion No. 4	Paddle steamer		Cincinnati, Ohio	United States	For private owner.
Unknown date	Chillingham	Barque	Robert Thompson	Sunderland	United Kingdom	For Scott & Co.
Unknown date	Clara	Full-rigged ship	James Laing	Sunderland	United Kingdom	For Teighe & Co.
Unknown date	Clyde	Gunboat		Bombay	(United Kingdom of Great Britain and Ireland) India	For Royal Navy.
Unknown date	Cocopah I	Sternwheeler			United States	For George A. Johnson & Company.
Unknown date	Commodore Perry	Ferry	Stack & Joyce	Williamsburg, New York	United States	For private owner.
Unknown date	Conestoga	Paddle steamer		Brownsville, Pennsylvania	United States	For private owner.
Unknown date	Cumbrian	Merchantman	J. Haswell	Sunderland	United Kingdom	For A. Tindall.
Unknown date	Cynthia	Brig	J. Barkes	Sunderland	United Kingdom	For Watson & Co.
Unknown date	Daylight	Steamboat	Samuel Sneden	New York	United States	For private owner.
Unknown date	Delta	Paddle steamer	Thames Ironworks and Shipbuilding Company	Blackwall	United Kingdom	For Peninsular and Oriental Steam Navigation Company.
Unknown date	Doris	Steamboat	Woolwich Steam Packet Company	Woolwich	United Kingdom	For Woolwich Steam Packet Company.
Unknown date	Ebenezer	Fishing smack	William Ashburner	Barrow-in-Furness	United Kingdom	For private owner.
Unknown date	Eden	Merchantman	R. Thompson	Sunderland	United Kingdom	For Graham Snowdon Jr. & John Snowdon.
Unknown date	Elizabeth Dawson	Barque	James Robinson	Sunderland	United Kingdom	For William Dawson.
Unknown date	Elizabeth Ferguson	Snow	Sykes & Co	Sunderland	United Kingdom	For J. Ferguson.
Unknown date	Elizabeth Ray	Brig	William Doxford	Sunderland	United Kingdom	For Ray & Sons.
Unknown date	Eliza Laing	Barque	Todd & Brown	Sunderland	United Kingdom	For J. & W. Blain.
Unknown date	Eliza Simmons or Lizzie Simmons	Paddle steamer		New Albany, Indiana	United States	For private owner.
Unknown date	Empress of India	Whaler		Newcastle upon Tyne	United Kingdom	For private owner.
Unknown date	Ethan Allen	Ferry		New York City	United States	For private owner.
Unknown date	Ethan Allen	Barque		Boston, Massachusetts	United States	For private owner.
Unknown date	Ethelreda	Merchantman	Peter Austin	Sunderland	United Kingdom	For W. Stephens.
Unknown date	Eudora	Barque	D. A. Douglas	Sunderland	United Kingdom	For Hudson & Co.
Unknown date	Fahrenheit	Merchantman	Rawson, or Rawson & Watson	Sunderland	United Kingdom	For Rankin & Co.
Unknown date	Fairplay	Paddle steamer		Albany, Indiana	United States	For private owner.
Unknown date	Fanny	Merchantman	D. A. Douglas	Sunderland	United Kingdom	For Mr. Scott.
Unknown date	Fessonia	Snow	G. Bartram	Sunderland	United Kingdom	For T. Reed.
Unknown date	Florida	Steamship		Greenpoint, New York	United Kingdom	For private owner.
Unknown date	Forest Fairy	Schooner	Messrs. Bayley	Ipswich	United Kingdom	For private owner.
Unknown date	Fox	Schooner		Baltimore, Maryland	United States	For private owner.
Unknown date	Gem of the South	Full-rigged ship	James Laing	Sunderland	United Kingdom	For Cox & Co.
Unknown date	General Kharsakov	Paddle steamer			United Kingdom	Transported to Vladivostok in sections for assembly there.
Unknown date	Gleam	Barque	Thomas Bilbe & Co.	Rotherhithe	United Kingdom	For Thomas Bilbe & Co.
Unknown date	Gondola	Merchantman	J. Briggs	Sunderland	United Kingdom	For W. Allen.
Unknown date	Grand Duke	Steamship		Jeffersonville, Indiana	United States	For private owner.
Unknown date	Guide	Fishing trawler		Brixham	United Kingdom	For Mr. Furneaux.
Unknown date	Habana	Steamship	Birely & Lynn	Philadelphia, Pennsylvania	United States	For New Orleans & Havana Steam Navigation Co.
Unknown date	Harkaway	Merchantman	C. Alcock	Sunderland	United Kingdom	For C. Alcock.
Unknown date	Harriet Lane	Cutter		New York	United States	For United States Revenue Cutter Service.
Unknown date	Havelock	Merchantman	W. Thackeray	Sunderland	United Kingdom	For Mr. Liversidge.
Unknown date	Hawthorn	Barque	R. Thompson	Sunderland	United Kingdom	For John Doxford.
Unknown date	Hermon Hill	Merchantman	Jopling & Willoughby	Sunderland	United Kingdom	For Mr. Longridge
Unknown date	Heron	Merchantman	Taylor & Scouter	Sunderland	United Kingdom	For Heron Laing.
Unknown date	Homer	Paddle steamer		Parkersburg, Virginia	United States	For private owner.
Unknown date	Ictíneo I	Submarine	Narcís Monturiol	Barcelona	Spain	For Monturiol, Font, Altadill y Cia.
Unknown date	Immortalité	Frigate		Pembroke Dockyard	United Kingdom	For Royal Navy.
Unknown date	Impetus	Full-rigged ship	James Laing	Sunderland	United Kingdom	For Cavan Bros.
Unknown date	Isabella	Schooner	Hodgson & Gardner	North Hylton	United Kingdom	For T. Wears.
Unknown date	Isabella	Barque	P. Foster	Sunderland	United Kingdom	For Black & Co.
Unknown date	Isabella Hartley	Merchantman	W. Thackeray	Sunderland	United Kingdom	For Banks & Co.
Unknown date	Island City	Schooner	Peter Perry	Sans Souci, Michigan	United States	For private owner.
Unknown date	James Duncan	Merchantman	James Laing	Sunderland	United Kingdom	For J. Duncan.
Unknown date	James Vinicomber	Full-rigged ship	W. Adamson	Sunderland	United Kingdom	For W. Adamson.
Unknown date	Jane Morell or Jane Morrell	Merchantman	W. Thackeray	Sunderland	United Kingdom	For Mr. Liversidge.
Unknown date	J. C. Kuhn	Barque	S. Gildersleeve & Sons	Portland, Connecticut	United States	For J. H. Brower & Co.
Unknown date	Jessie Roberts	Schooner	John Anderton	Runcorn	United Kingdom	For private owner.
Unknown date	John Howard	Yorkshire Billyboy	Atkinson & Thompson	Knottingley	United Kingdom	For John Howard & Joseph Crabtree.
Unknown date	Jonquille	Schooner	W. Thackeray	Sunderland	United Kingdom	For private owner.
Unknown date	Jordan	Brig	James Robinson	Sunderland	United Kingdom	For Mr. Longridge.
Unknown date	Juanita	Merchantman	William Doxford	Sunderland	United Kingdom	For John Rodha & Co.
Unknown date	Keepsake	Merchantman	J. Robinson	Sunderland	United Kingdom	For W. Gray.
Unknown date	Kirkland	Merchantman	G. Peverall	Sunderland	United Kingdom	For Peacock Bros.
Unknown date	Laurel	Merchantman	J. T. Alcock	Sunderland	United Kingdom	For J. Alcock.
Unknown date	Linda Florida	Merchantman	J. Denniston	Sunderland	United Kingdom	For George Watson.
Unknown date	Lois	Snow	Briggs	Sunderland	United Kingdom	For Lewis & Co.
Unknown date	Ly-ee-Moon	Steamship			Unknown	For private owner.
Unknown date	Lymm Gray	Brig	John Anderton	Runcorn	United Kingdom	For private owner.
Unknown date	Magnet	Schooner	B. Hodgson, or Hodgson & Gardner	North Hylton	United Kingdom	For Wilson & Co.
Unknown date	Mangerton	Merchantman	James Laing	Sunderland	United Kingdom	For Hardy & Co.
Unknown date	Maori	Merchantman	J. Barkes	Sunderland	United Kingdom	For private owner.
Unknown date	Marion	Paddle steamer	Roosevelt, Joyce & Co.	New York	United States	For private owner.
Unknown date	Mary	Schooner	William Bonker	Salcombe	United Kingdom	For William M. Cove and others.
Unknown date	Mary Ann	Merchantman	W. Adamson	Sunderland	United Kingdom	For private owner.
Unknown date	Matchless	Schooner			United States	For private owner.
Unknown date	M. C. Etheridge	Schooner		Plymouth, North Carolina	United States	For J. Brown.
Unknown date	Meggy	Merchantman	W. Ratcliffe	Sunderland	United Kingdom	For E. Storey.
Unknown date	Melita	Merchantman	C. Alcock	Sunderland	United Kingdom	For Foster & Co.
Unknown date	Menorca	Steamship	Messrs. Tod & MacGregor	Partick	United Kingdom	For Port-Mahon Steam Packet Company.
Unknown date	Minerva	Merchantman	J. Davison	Sunderland	United Kingdom	For J. Carr.
Unknown date	Mingo	Sternwheeler		California, Pennsylvania	United States	For private owner.
Unknown date	Monticello	Steamship		Mystic, Connecticut	United States	For H. P. Cromwell & Company.
Unknown date	Mount Vernon	Steamship		Brooklyn, New York	United States	For private owner.
Unknown date	Mystery	Merchantman	S. Metcalf	Sunderland	United Kingdom	For Mr. McKenzie.
Unknown date	New London	Steamship		Mystic, Connecticut	United States	For private owner.
Unknown date	Nightwatch	Merchantman	W. Naizby	Sunderland	United Kingdom	For Mr. Naizby.
Unknown date	Normanby	Steamship	Messrs. Pile, Spence & Co.	West Hartlepool	United Kingdom	For private owner.
Unknown date	Ocean Belle	Snow	W. Pile	Sunderland	United Kingdom	For James & Co.
Unknown date	Olive Branch	Snow	G. Bartram	Sunderland	United Kingdom	For Joseph Dove.
Unknown date	Patrician	Full-rigged ship	George Marshall	Sunderland	United Kingdom	For G. Marshall.
Unknown date	Patroon	Steamship		Philadelphia, Pennsylvania	United States	For R. T. Loper.
Unknown date	Pedro Ferrer	Barque	R. Thompson	Sunderland	United Kingdom	For William Nicholson.
Unknown date	Peeress	Merchantman	William Doxford	Sunderland	United Kingdom	For J. Fleming.
Unknown date	Peterborough	Barque	Austin & Mills	Sunderland	United Kingdom	For Mr. Hankey.
Unknown date	Petrel	Schooner	Jopling & Hobson, or Jopling & Willoughby	Sunderland	United Kingdom	For Mr. Westgarth.
Unknown date	Philadelphia	Paddle steamer		Chester, Pennsylvania	United States	For private owner.
Unknown date	Pride of the Wear	Merchantman	W. Pickersgill	Sunderland	United Kingdom	For Mears & Co.
Unknown date	Princess Clothilde	Barque	G. Peverall	Sunderland	United Kingdom	For Mr. Williamson.
Unknown date	Punjaub	Barque	Rawson, or Rawson & Watson	Sunderland	United Kingdom	For Mr. Collingwood.
Unknown date	Queen of the Netherlands	Merchantman	William Doxford	Sunderland	United Kingdom	For P. R. Los.
Unknown date	Queen's Own	Barque	T. H. Woods	Sunderland	United Kingdom	For Peacock Bros.
Unknown date	R. E. & A. N. Watson	Steamship		Belle Vernon, Pennsylvania	United States	For private owner.
Unknown date	Red Rover	Paddle steamer		Cape Girardeau, Missouri	United States	For private owner.
Unknown date	Revenue	Merchantman	J. Briggs	Sunderland	United Kingdom	For Pellier & Co.
Unknown date	Ridesdale	Merchantman	G. W. Hall	Sunderland	United Kingdom	For Donkin & Co.
Unknown date	Rising Sun	Snow	S. P. Austin	Sunderland	United Kingdom	For William Kish.
Unknown date	Rosella	Merchantman	J. Briggs	Sunderland	United Kingdom	For W. Atkinson.
Unknown date	Rose of Sharon	Barque	R. Thompson Jr.	Sunderland	United Kingdom	For Watson & Co.
Unknown date	Russell	Merchantman	J. Davison	Sunderland	United Kingdom	For Mr. Atkinson.
Unknown date	Seraphina	Merchantman	J. Lister	Sunderland	United Kingdom	For John Hastie.
Unknown date	Sir George Gray	Barque	W. Gray	Sunderland	United Kingdom	For H. Ellis.
Unknown date	Sir John Lawrence	Merchantman	James Laing	Sunderland	United Kingdom	For J.Lidgett & Sons.
Unknown date	Smyrna	Steamship	James Laing	Sunderland	United Kingdom	For S. Xenos.
Unknown date	Stagshaw	Merchantman	T. Stonehouse	Sunderland	United Kingdom	For G. Dryden.
Unknown date	Stanley	Steamship	Pile, Spence & Co.	West Hartlepool	United Kingdom	For private owner.
Unknown date	T. D. Horner	Sternwheeler		Brownsville, Pennsylvania	United States	For private owner.
Unknown date	Thames	Merchantman	James Laing	Sunderland	United Kingdom	For J. Smurthwaite.
Unknown date	Thomas Pearson	Schooner	R. Brown	Northwich	United Kingdom	For private owner.
Unknown date	Thomas Wood	Barque	Austin & Mills	Sunderland	United Kingdom	For Francis Ritson & Co.
Unknown date	Thunder	Steamship	Langley	Deptford	United Kingdom	For private owner.
Unknown date	Tilly	Steamship	Messrs. Blackwood & Gordon	Cartvale	United Kingdom	For Bombay General Steam Navigation Company.
Unknown date	Trebiskin	Schooner	Mr. Bennett	Padstow	United Kingdom	For private owner.
Unknown date	Valley City	Steamship		Philadelphia, Pennsylvania	United States	For private owner.
Unknown date	Victoria	Schooner	J. & R. Bailey	Shoreham-by-Sea	United Kingdom	For private owner.
Unknown date	Wear	Merchantman	James Laing	Sunderland	United Kingdom	For J. Smurthwaite et al.
Unknown date	Wentworth	Merchantman	Austin & Mills	Sunderland	United Kingdom	For Hankey & Co.
Unknown date	Westbury	Merchantman	W. Pile	Sunderland	United Kingdom	For Thomas B. Walker & Co.
Unknown date	Wild Duck	Merchantman	J. Robinson	Sunderland	United Kingdom	For Mr. Seymour.
Unknown date	William & Jane	Merchantman	Duncan & Co, or J. Duncan	Sunderland	United Kingdom	For William Legge.
Unknown date	William G. Anderson	Barque	C. C. & H. D. Gardiner	Boston, Massachusetts	United States	For Edmund Boynton.
Unknown date	William Harper	Barque	J. Lister	Sunderland	United Kingdom	For W. Harper.
Unknown date	Yorktown	Paddle steamer	William H. Webb	New York	United States	For private owner.

== =Citations ==
=== Bibliography ===
- Mitchell, WH; Sawyer, LA (1990). The Empire Ships (Second ed.). London, New York, Hamburg, Hong Kong: Lloyd's of London Press Ltd. ISBN 1-85044-275-4.
- Wadia, R. A. (1986) [1957]. The Bombay Dockyard and the Wadia Master Builders. Bombay: Foudroyant Committee of The Society for Nautical Research.
