= Albert Aspinall =

Australian stonemason and builder

Albert Wood Aspinall (27 December 1839 – 15 December 1903) was an Australian stonemason and builder. He was an expert in constructing round towers and buildings.

== Early life ==
Aspinall was born in Exley Bank Bottom, Southowram, West Riding of Yorkshire, England. He came to Australia in 1857 with his parents, John Aspinall and Sarah (née Ingham), and siblings, aboard the Mary Ann. He was their third, but second surviving son. In 1864, Albert married Mary Jane Bennett with whom he had thirteen children, seven of whom lived into adulthood.

== Early constructions ==
Aspinall moved frequently to wherever his building contracts took him. Much of his early work was done in the Sydney area. For about one year in 1865 he was building in the Maitland district. It is unknown whether any of the stone buildings still standing in the area were built by him.

== Penrith ==
Aspinall moved his family to Liverpool for about five years from 1876 while he constructed stone buildings in the vicinity. During this period Albert constructed the Police Station and Lockup at Penrith. For many years, the building was regarded as a historic building by the Nepean District Historical Society. Recent expansion in Penrith resulted in the demolition of the buildings but archival material remains.

== St Peters brick kilns ==
In the mid-1880s, Aspinall was contracted to construct the brick-firing kilns of the St Peters brick works. Some kilns were located beside the quarry next to the Illawarra railway line (now filled and transformed into the Camdenville Oval). These kilns have been demolished. It is not known whether the historic brick kilns at the north-west corner of Sydney Park were also his construction.

== Building Green Cape Lighthouse and the Eden Post Office ==
Aspinall's longest project was the partial building of the Green Cape Lighthouse on Green Cape, at the northern tip of Disaster Bay, south of Eden. The Eden Killer Whale Museum and Historical Society has information concerning this project and the suicide of Aspinall. The precinct of the lighthouse is now a historic tourist site.

Building the lighthouse started in the late 1870s, with the construction of a jetty and storehouse at Bittangabee Bay. Aspinall then spent five months building a seven-kilometre wooden tramway from Bittangabee Bay to Green Cape. Soon, he found that the soil and rock were unsuitable for the foundations of such a heavy structure. The foundations had to be made much deeper than he had expected. He also experienced difficulties with his hired labourers. Building the lighthouse took almost 3 years, a period much longer than he had anticipated. The construction drained him financially and physically. It became necessary for him to accept other contracts elsewhere during the period of construction. Then his health began to fail. At times, Aspinall was forced to spend time in Pambula Hospital. He committed suicide in Eden in 1903. He is buried in the Eden Cemetery. The Eden newspapers contained lengthy articles about his death.

Graphic details from the period are still held by the museum. His creditors completed the lighthouse.

In the late 1880s, Aspinall also constructed the post office at Eden. It was officially opened in 1891. It is now an historic building. In the early 1890s, Aspinall carried out the renovations of the New Brighton Hotel to adapt the building as a boarding school for his brother, Arthur Aspinall.

== Ill-health and a patent ==
Aspinall found drinking a herbal tea made from an infusion of the leaves of the coastal sea box Alyxia buxifolis helped his medical condition. He applied for and secured the patent for this herbal tea.

== Family ==
Aspinall's only son did not have children. Mary died in 1886. In 1887 Aspinall married a widow from Eden, Eliza Silk (née Marshall). The marriage did not last. A grandson, James Goyen, and a great-grandson, Charles Mannins, also became builders. Both had a suburban Sydney street named after them.

== John Ingham Aspinall ==
Albert's elder brother, John, was also a stonemason of note, both in Australia and in New Zealand. His early constructions were in the Newtown-Camperdown-Enmore area. Some of the stone buildings still standing in these areas may have been constructed by John, but rarely is the name of a builder retained for a building.

The cream sandstone house, "Arden Lea", which John Aspinall built for his son, still stands. The house is nestled at the foot of a cliff on what was a large property at 8 View Street, Woolwich. When his daughter-in-law died the property was sold and sub-divided. Aspinall Place, off View Street, was named after the family. Access to the house was lost until stairs were constructed from Werambie Street whence the address was altered to 1a Werambie Street, Woolwich.
