= Green Cape =

Green Cape may refer to:

- Green Cape, New South Wales
- Cabo Verde — Green Cape in Portuguese
