= Green Cape Lighthouse =

Lighthouse in New South Wales, Australia

Green Cape Lighthouse (original)
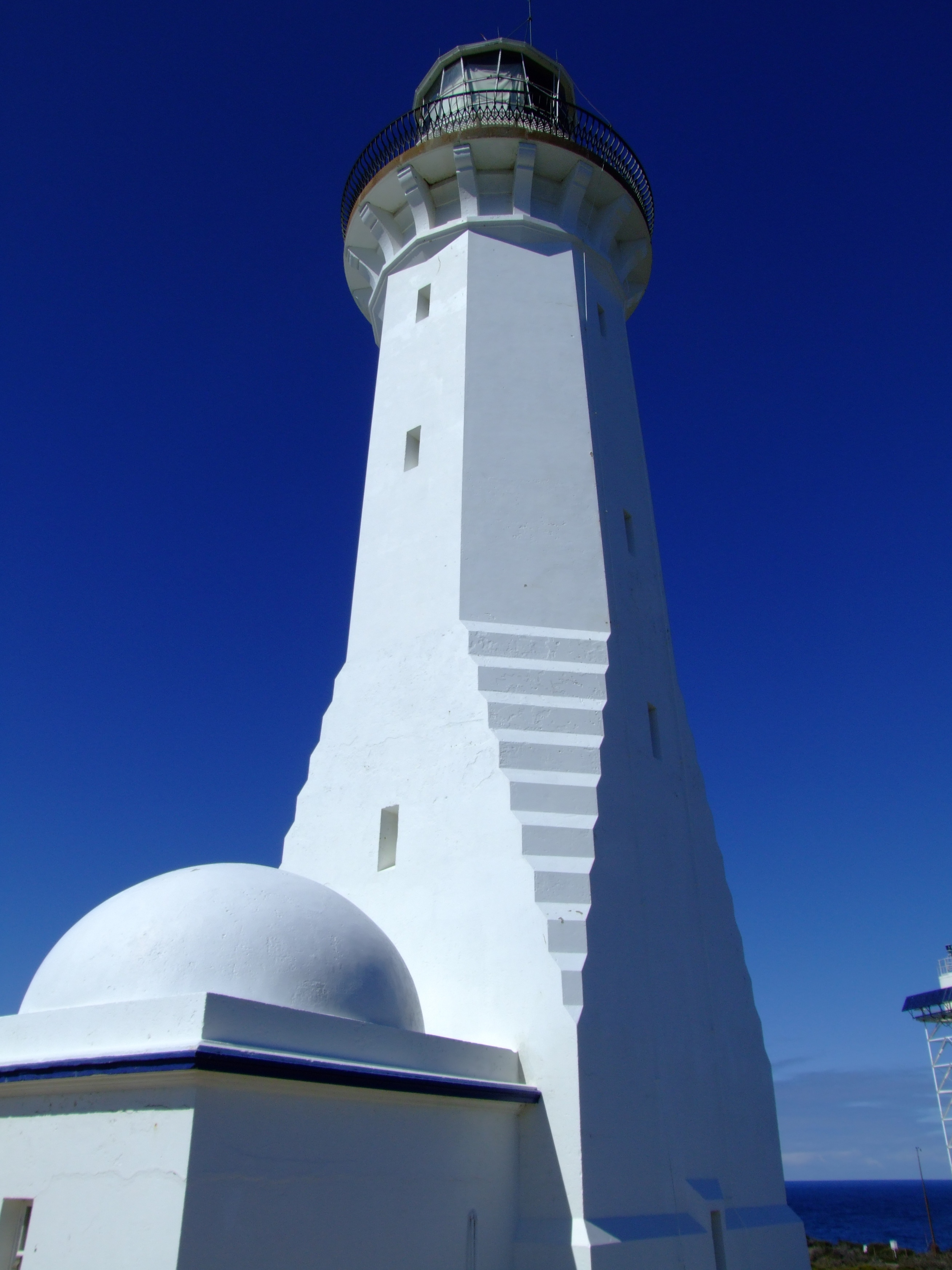
- Green Cape Lighthouse
- Location: Green Cape, New South Wales, Australia
- Coordinates: 37°15′41″S 150°02′58″E

Tower
- Built by: Albert Aspinall
- Construction: concrete (tower)
- Height: 29 m (95 ft)
- Shape: square base octagonal tower with balcony and lantern
- Markings: White (tower), black (balcony)
- Power source: mains electricity
- Operator: Australian Maritime Safety Authority
- Heritage: Heritage Act — State Heritage Register

Light
- First lit: 1883
- Deactivated: 1992
- Focal height: 44 m (144 ft)
- Lens: first order Fresnel lens
- Intensity: 1,000,000 candela
- Range: 22 nmi (41 km; 25 mi)
- Characteristic: Fl(2) W 10s
- Green Cape Light (current)
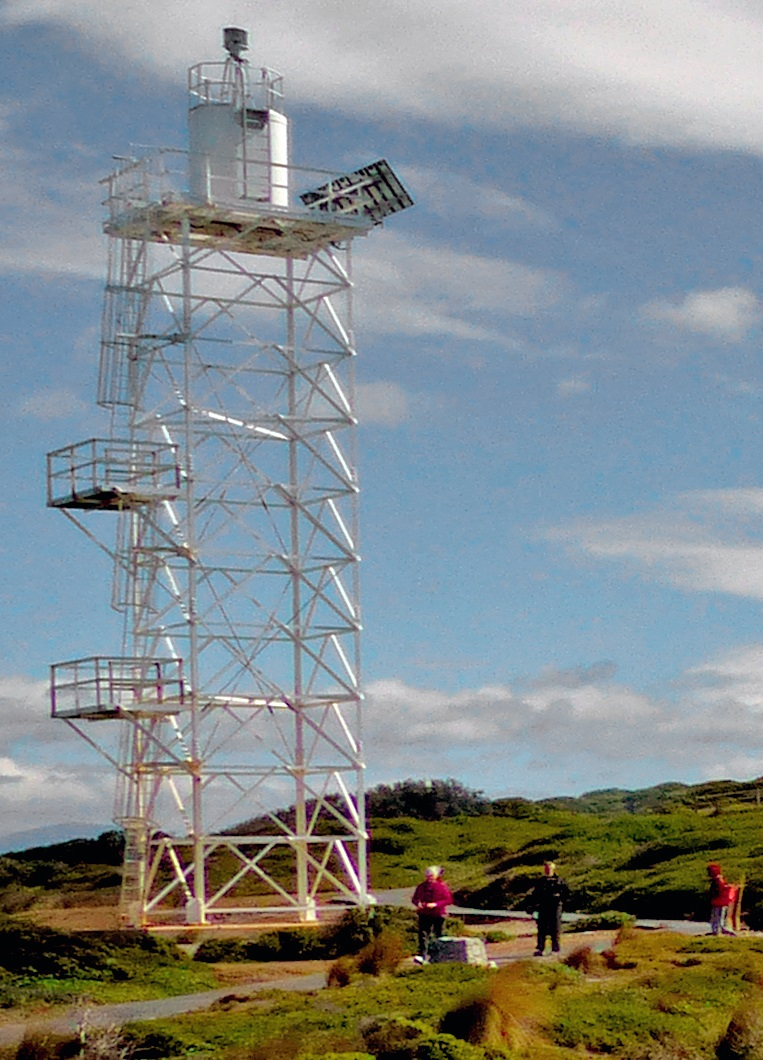
- Constructed: 1992
- Construction: metal skeletal tower
- Height: 49 feet (15 m)
- Shape: square pyramidal tower
- Markings: White
- Operator: NSW National Parks and Wildlife Service
- Focal height: 118 feet (36 m)
- Intensity: 37,500 candela
- Range: 17 nmi (31 km; 20 mi)
- Characteristic: Fl(2) W 15s

The Green Cape Lighthouse is a heritage-listed lighthouse located at the tip of Green Cape, a headland forming the northern boundary of Disaster Bay, in southern New South Wales, Australia. It is the southernmost lighthouse in New South Wales and Australia's first lighthouse built in concrete. At 29 metres (95 ft) it is also the tallest lighthouse in New South Wales. It marks Green Cape on the northerly shore-hugging sailing course.

The lighthouse was designed by James Barnet and built from 1881 to 1883 by Albert Wood Aspinall. It was added to the New South Wales State Heritage Register on 1 February 2013.

== History ==
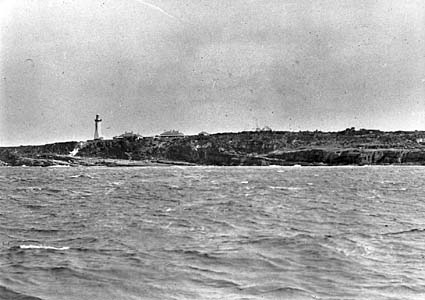
Green Cape, 1902

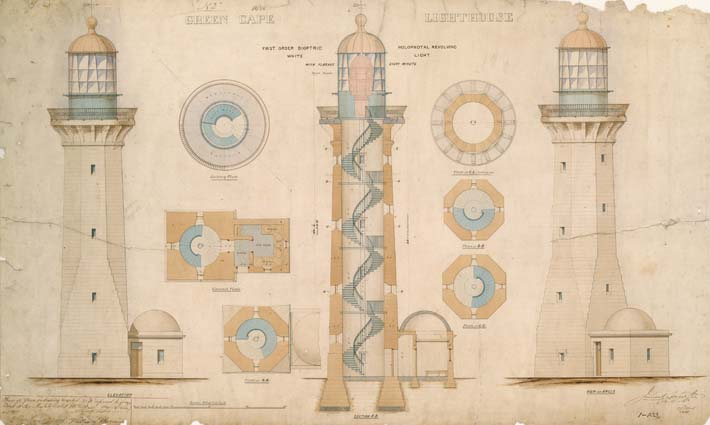
Original plans of the lighthouse.

Green Cape is traditionally part of the Yuin nation and is the land of the Thaua people. The land occupied by the Thaua group stretches from Merimbula in the north, to Green Cape in the south, and west to the Dividing Range and has traditionally been divided between two groups – the Katungal (coastal) and the Baianbal/Paienbara (forest) people.

The first contact between the European explorers and the Aboriginal people of the far southern region of NSW occurred in 1798 when Matthew Flinders visited Twofold Bay, south of Eden. On this exploratory journey, Flinders made reference to Green Point or, as he called it then, "the Cape". Permanent European settlement of the region did not, however, begin until the 1830s and 1840s when the pastoralist and whaling industries developed at Twofold Bay.

"Twofold Bay afforded the potential for raising stock on unoccupied Crown Land in the vicinity of a commodious harbour" and it quickly became a commercial and trading centre during the mid-nineteenth century. The Imlay brothers were the first settlers to permanently occupy the area from the late 1830s and established a pastoral and whaling company in the region.

The developing industries around Twofold Bay soon revealed the potential of the region and began attracting competition for the Imlay brothers. The British entrepreneur Ben Boyd arrived and went about establishing his own commercial empire during the 1840s – the ambitious but short-lived "Boyd Town". By the time Boyd had entered the whaling industry, the once thriving business was reaching the end of its boom period – the Imlay brothers had fallen victim to the economic depression in the late 1840s and, by 1849, Boyd too had abandoned his pastoral lands following the collapse of his empire.

Although whaling had not been a sustainable industry in the region, the Green Cape area was a notable point in the shipping trade along the NSW coastline. A prominent natural headland projecting out into Disaster Bay, Green Cape was a known obstacle for passing ships. Since shipping had accelerated following the gold rush of the 1850s, the entire NSW coastline, in fact, had been regarded as dangerous and increasingly treacherous. Despite the first lighthouse being constructed at South Head in 1818, it was some 40 years before the government systematically began installing lightstations along the coast.

Initially, consideration was only given to the north coast of NSW but, by 1872, the entire coastline was under review. Captain Francis Hixson, President of the Marine Board of NSW, famously proclaimed "that he wanted the NSW coast "illuminated like a street with lamps" " (NPWS "Lighthouse Keeping (Part A)", p15). Hixson was ultimately successful in achieving his vision – by the early twentieth century, the "highway of lights" was complete with 25 coastal lighthouses and 12 in Sydney Harbour. The late nineteenth century had proven to be the most productive period for lighthouse construction in NSW.

The need for a lighthouse was approved in 1873 at the conference of the Principal Officers of Marine Departments of the Australian Colonies on a motion from Hixson, following a series of wrecks on the southern shore. After rounding Cape Howe, northerly ships would hug the shore to avoid the East Australian Current. Green Cape was the first major projection they would encounter. Original tenders were for a stone lighthouse and rubble quarters. However, with the soft local sedimentary, no one tendered. In 1870 the specifications were changed to concrete and a budget of £17,000 AUD was set.

With an approved design by the colonial architect James Barnet in 1880, a tender of £12,936 was accepted from Albert Aspinall in December 1880 to build a mass concrete tower for the lighthouse, three associated residential structures and a number of service buildings. Aspinall also received an additional 357 pounds for essential works at Bittangabee Bay.

Aspinall first had to find a way to move the materials from Eden to the site. The nearest safe anchorage was in Bittangabee Bay, north along the coast from Green Cape, where he built his storeroom and jetty. He then spent five months building a 7 kilometres (4.3 mi) wooden tramway from Bittangabee Bay to the cape. Materials were transported to the site on wooden trolleys pulled by horses. This first phase was completed in June 1881, and Aspinall commenced the construction.

The construction of a lightstation at Green Cape was considered essential and the project was ambitious from its beginnings. Concrete construction was a bold initiative for the period and Green Cape Lightstation was one of the earliest and most extensive concrete constructions ever attempted in Australia and the tallest in NSW at the time. Prior to 1880, some small houses were built using concrete but no public buildings, and certainly none as substantial as the Green Cape, had been constructed using the material.

Work began in 1881 but Aspinall soon encountered significant difficulties that led to increasing delays and an extension of the budget to over 18,000 pounds. A 20-foot thick clay bed required extensive excavation and, with drifting sand continually covering the tramway and building foundations, the demanding circumstances of the build led to the eventual financial collapse of Aspinall's career. Ultimately, the Green Cape Lightstation was completed by his creditors and was fully operational, with a kerosene-powered light visible for 35 km, by 1883. The final cost for the lighthouse was 19,388 pounds, 8 shillings and 9 pence.

The original apparatus, still mounted in the lantern, is a Chance Bros. 1st order revolving Fresnel lens dioptric. Its light characteristic was one flash every 50 seconds and it was visible to 19 nautical miles (35 km; 22 mi). The light source was a four-wick kerosene-burning lamp with an intensity of 100,000 cd.

The newly completed Green Cape Lightstation was in this functional state on 30 May 1886 – the night of the Ly-ee-Moon disaster. On a clear, calm night en route from Melbourne to Sydney, the paddle-steamer ran full-speed into rocks at the base of the lighthouse and quickly broke apart. Seventy-one lives were lost in the sinking – one of the greatest losses of human life in a single shipwreck in the state's history. Fifteen men (ten crew and five passengers) survived the shipwreck but only 24 bodies were ever recovered and buried in unmarked graves in a small cemetery a short distance from the lightstation. Flora MacKillop, the mother of Mary MacKillop, died in that accident.

The wreck of the Ly-ee-Moon is considered to be one of NSW's worst maritime disasters but the far south coast of NSW has been responsible for a number of shipwrecks since the nineteenth century. Often caused by heavy seas and rough weather, Disaster Bay has become "a veritable graveyard" of ships.

In 1910 the light source was replaced with a Douglas vaporised kerosene burner and a glass chimney around a silk mantle, made by Chance Bros. In 1913 it was recommended to change the light characteristic to a white flash every 10 seconds. However, it took 16 years until this recommendation was accepted, in 1926. Previous to that, in 1923, the light source was upgraded to a Ford Schmidt burner which increased the intensity of the light to 327,000 cd.

Throughout the twentieth century, the Green Cape Lightstation underwent the same technical advancements as did all coastal lighthouses in Australia. With responsibility transferred to the Commonwealth in 1911, the lightstation was converted from kerosene to electricity in 1962. In 1962 the tower was electrified with diesel generators serving as the power source. The manual winding system was also replaced with an electric motor. The lightglove used provided a light intensity of 475,000 cd. In 1967 improved generators were installed together with a 1000 W Tungsten-halogen lamp with an intensity of 1,000,000 cd, visible over 20 nautical miles (37 km; 23 mi). The light characteristic was changed to two flashes every ten seconds. At some later point, the power source was changed to the mains electricity. The lighthouse was then gradually de-staffed over the next 30 years.

In 1992 a solar powered lens on a modern lattice skeletal steel tower was constructed right next to the historic tower, and the light was officially turned off on 17 March 1992. The new light operated a 36 W lamp with an intensity of 37,500 cd. With this conversion, the lightstation was effectively de-staffed and a caretaker installed at the site. Once replaced by a new and fully automatic lighthouse, the station became a tourist destination and was recognised for its heritage values. In 2009, Green Cape Lightstation was designated an Engineering Heritage National Landmark – the first lighthouse to be accorded this level of recognition in Australia.

In 2026 the steel tower had reached the end of its life and after considering cost and the site’s heritage it was replaced by installing a new rotating 10W LED light in the original tower, using the original lens and mercury floatation mechanism.

== Description ==
Green Cape is the location of the southernmost lightstation in NSW – some 400 km from Sydney and 27 km north of the Victorian border.

The lightstation is a tightly knit complex of buildings that comprises the original lighthouse; the 1994 light tower; the Head Keepers Quarters; duplex quarters for the two Assistant Keepers; stables; telegraph station; ancillary buildings; communication tower; solar panels; and remnant foundations of various structures.

At the eastern end of the main precinct, the Green Cape Lighthouse stands 29m tall, 23m above sea level. An octagonal concrete tower on a square base, the lighthouse is built of locally quarried rock aggregate and was finished with a Chance Bros lantern house. A small domed building, formerly used as an oil store, adjoins the lighthouse.

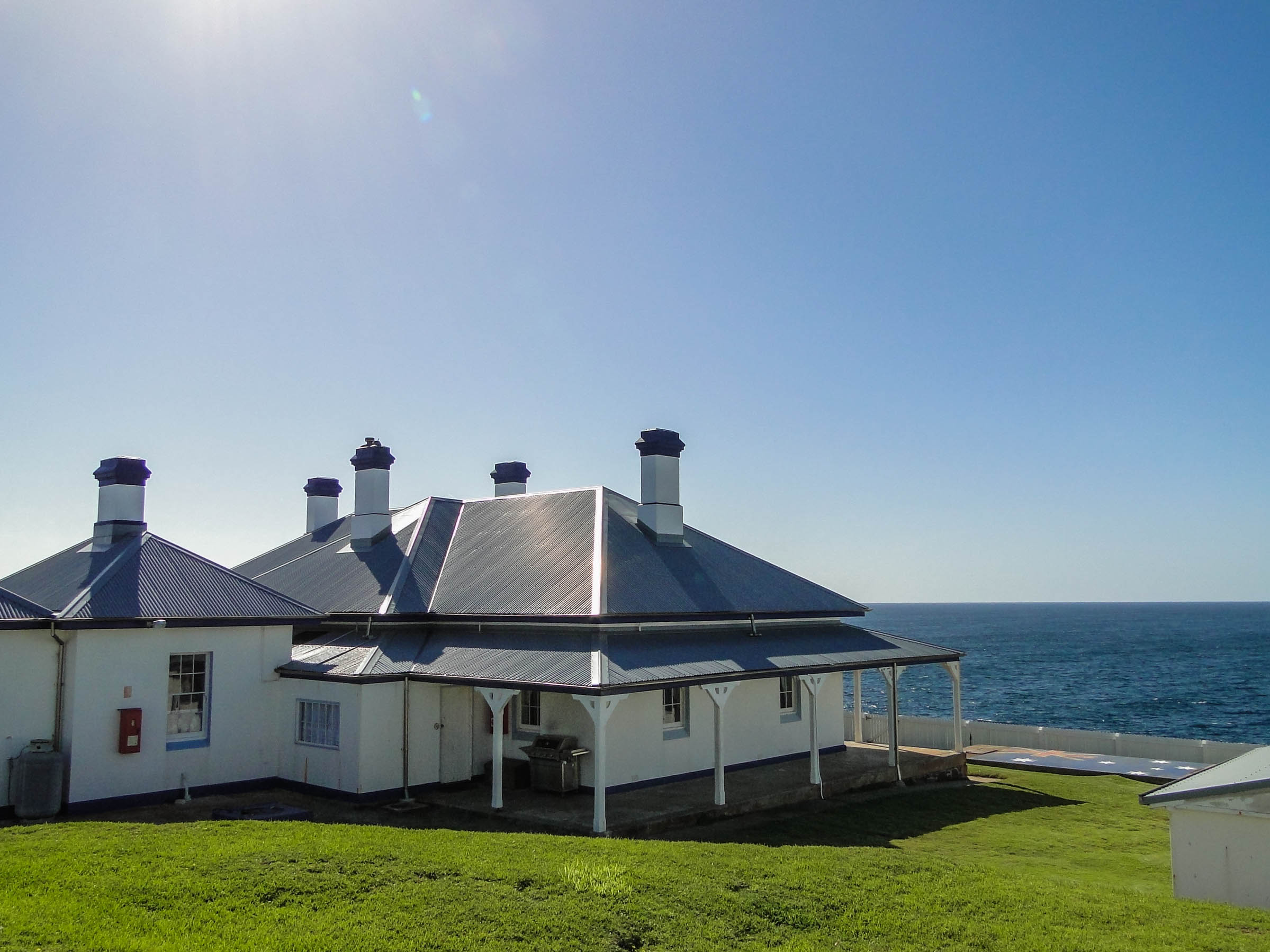
Green Cape cottage

The complex of buildings that make up the lightstation include a number of simple painted rendered brick buildings typical of rural lightstations around Australia. The residences of the Head Keeper and the two Assistant Keepers (and families) were built in the Victorian Regency style and retain much of their original features and layout. The Head Keepers Quarters comprises four bedrooms with a parlour and living room, surrounded by a verandah on three sides. An adjoining annex houses storage rooms and an updated bathroom and kitchen. The Assistant Keepers Quarters are an identical duplex comprising two bedrooms, a living room, dining room, kitchen and bathroom (similarly updated). The duplexes are surrounded by verandahs on three sides also. The original arrangement of the quarters remains identifiable but a door has been fitted between the two living rooms to enable its use as a single residence.

The original form of the other buildings in the lightstation complex (the stables, telegraph station etc.) are also evident despite later modifications that were made to support changes in use over time.

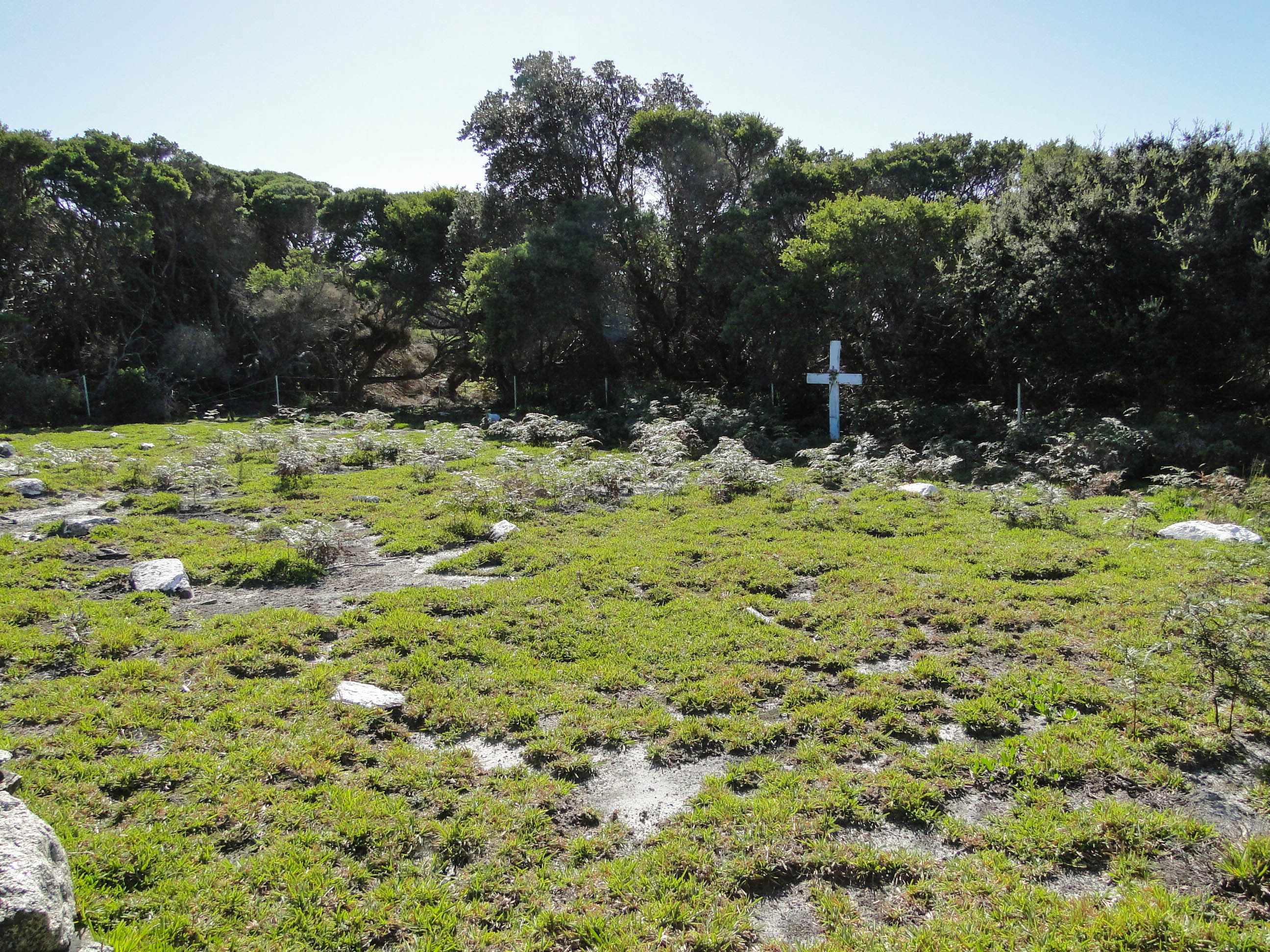
Ly-ee-Moon Cemetery at Green Cape

Immediately outside of the lightstation precinct, and 300m from the lighthouse, is the Ly-ee-Moon cemetery and, located off-shore, the shipwreck itself. The small cemetery is bound by a simple metal wire fence and contains 23 graves, each marked by a pair of white head and foot stones. The graves are positioned in two rows of ten and one smaller row of three but, with the passing of time, the graves are no longer identifiable. A bronze plaque was placed in the southern corner in 1986, on the centenary of the disaster.

Located further afield, some 7 km north of the lightstation at Bittangabee Bay, there are remnants of the original port and jetty that was built prior to the construction of the lighthouse. A mass concrete store still stands (without windows, doors or a roof); concrete footings of the former jetty are evident on the rocky shore and there are existing remnants of the beginning of the tramway that transported materials and equipment to Green Cape for the construction of the lightstation.

The ongoing use of the site as a lighthouse and as a tourist destination has ensured that the site is maintained to a very good standard. Permanent staff in residence at the site see to its day-to-day maintenance.

Despite more recent alterations and modifications to kitchen and bathroom facilities to ensure the ongoing use of the site, the original detail and layout of the main buildings in the lightstation remains clearly evident today.

Although the lightstation buildings have undergone some modifications to support the ongoing use of the site, the original detail and layout of the buildings remains evident today. The layout of each of the residential buildings remains largely unaltered but the facilities have been updated.

Recent modifications to the site include the conversion of the Head Keepers and Assistant Keepers Quarters to residences for the site caretaker and for holiday accommodation. Today, the site also has had solar panel boards installed and new fencing, car park and walking trails created.

In 2012, the National Parks and Wildlife Service undertook necessary maintenance works (including rust removal, reglazing the light tower dome, treating rising damp in the residences, roof works, new paint, timber replacement and an electricity upgrade).

As a complex, the integrity of the lightstation and its ability to demonstrate its history remains strong. This ability is reflected in its contemporary use as a tourist destination.

== Site operation ==
The current light is operated by the Australian Maritime Safety Authority. The site is managed by the Department of Environment, Climate Change and Water as part of the Beowa National Park.

== Visiting ==
The grounds are open to the public, and the tower is open to guided tours on some days of the week. Reservations for the guided tours are recommended. Accommodation is available in the two assistant keepers' cottages which sleep up to six people each.

== Heritage listing ==
Green Cape Maritime Precinct was listed on the New South Wales State Heritage Register on 1 February 2013 with the following statement of significance:

The Green Cape Maritime Precinct is of state heritage significance as a notable lightstation in the "highway of lights" that were erected along the NSW coastline during the late nineteenth century. Recommended by Captain Francis Hixson (President of the Marine Board of NSW) and designed by the colonial architect, James Barnet, Green Cape Lightstation was an ambitious and unique development for its period. Although the 1880s was the most productive period for the construction of lighthouses in NSW, Green Cape was one of the earliest and most extensive concrete constructions ever attempted in Australia.

The construction of the lightstation was possible because of the development of Bittangabee Bay as a trans-shipment point to receive materials, equipment and labour for the construction. These materials were then taken along a horse-drawn tramway, seven kilometres through the forest to the site of the lightstation.

The lightstation was also the site of the wrecking of the Ly-ee-Moon on the night of 30 May 1886. Considered to be one of NSW's worst maritime disasters, the loss of 71 lives that night was one of the greatest shipwreck tragedies in the state's history. Fifteen people survived the wreck and 24 bodies were recovered and buried in unmarked graves in a small cemetery a short distance from the lightstation.

— Statement of significance, New South Wales State Heritage Register.

== See also ==
- List of lighthouses in Australia
