= SS Ly-ee-Moon =

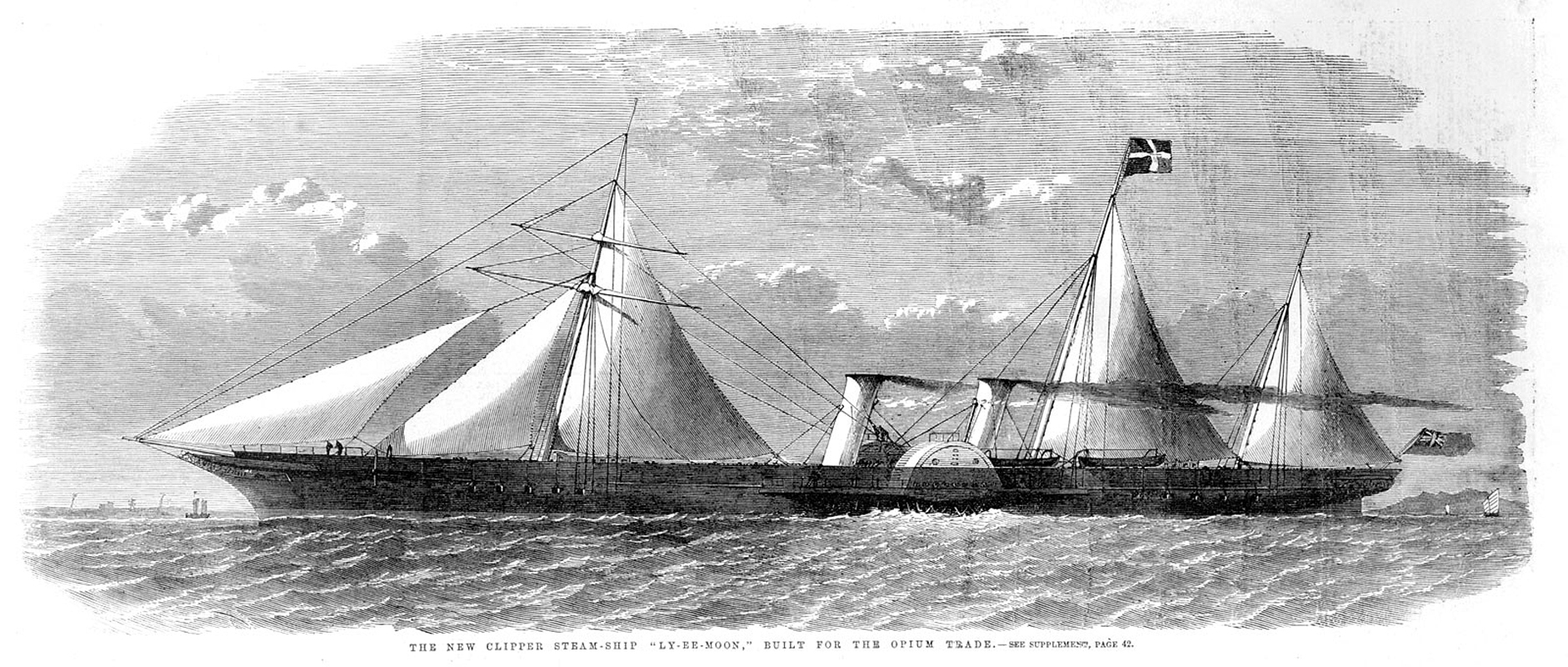
SS Ly-ee-Moon as depicted in The Illustrated London News, 1860

SS Ly-ee-Moon was a steamship which was wrecked off Green Cape, New South Wales on the night of 30 May 1886. The vessel ran aground and broke apart while en route from Melbourne, Victoria to Sydney, resulting in the loss of 71 of the 86 people on board.

The disaster occurred during a clear, calm night and the newly completed Green Cape Lighthouse was in a functional state at the time. The paddle-steamer ran full-speed into rocks at the base of the lighthouse and quickly broke apart. This led to one of the greatest losses of human life in a single shipwreck in the state's history. Fifteen men (ten crew and five passengers) survived the shipwreck but only 24 bodies were ever recovered and were buried in unmarked graves in a small cemetery a short distance from the lightstation. Flora MacKillop, mother of Mary MacKillop, died in the accident.

The wreck of the Ly-ee-Moon is considered as one of New South Wales' worst maritime disasters.
