= James Goyen =

Australian businessman

The builder James Goyen (10 May 1905 – 3 April 1984) constructed many houses and other buildings in the St George District, south of the Cooks River, New South Wales, Australia. Initially he had trained as a carpenter. His ability, leadership skills, personal qualities and business acumen transformed him from an employee to a builder of note. Many local tradesmen were employed by him, making him an asset to the district in which he lived.

== Works depot ==
James' company was registered as J A Goyen Pty, Ltd and is listed in relevant phone books. By 1972, the company was in the names Goyen, J A and McIntyre, C R. His works depot was at 18 Montgomery Street, Kogarah and, later, at 4 Montgomery Street, Kogarah.

== House building ==
The first house built by James ("Jimmy") Goyen was a modest dwelling built for his sister, Martha Mannins, at 36 Gibbes Street, Rockdale in 1924. Apart from bricking in the basement the house remained unaltered into the late 1990s. (Martha's son, Charles Nicholas Mannins, later became a builder as well. Mannins Avenue, Kingsgrove is named after him because he constructed the houses in the street.)

The Depression of the 1930s disrupted his building work. During this period he found work as an employee of a greengrocer.

Many of the houses built by James have a distinctive, decorative brickwork which was often used as a signature to his work. Goyen Avenue, Bexley was named after him for he was responsible for the construction of the houses in the street. Houses with this unique style of brickwork are characteristic of many houses in the avenue. Other houses with his typical style of brickwork are dotted around the district. These include houses in George Street, Rockdale and in Bay Street, Brighton-Le-Sands (on the south side of the street, just east of West Botany Street, Rockdale).

After World War II there was a housing shortage leading to a frenzy in house construction. Building materials became very scarce. James and his business partner, C R McIntyre, won the tender to construct houses in a new estate in Brighton-le-Sands in what is now McIntyre Avenue. The contrast in housing design and construction between the pre-war houses in Goyen Avenue and those in McIntyre Avenue reflect this difficulty in obtaining suitable and adequate building materials. This contrast is further reflected by the differences in building materials used in McIntyre Avenue and in the house built nearby several years earlier at 6 Carinya Ave for James' cousin. James was engaged to build the house. But he saw how scarce building materials were becoming and he was not free to start the construction for some months. So James passed the responsibility for building the house at 6 Carinya Avenue to his bricklayer, Mr Cheyney, to ensure that adequate building materials were available for the construction of the house.

== World War II ==
James could not serve in the army or air force because of severe deafness, the result of scarlet fever when he was 14 years of age. James and his workmen not of military age were employed by the Public Works Department of New South Wales to build air-raid shelters.

== Government tenders ==
James' firm won the tender to construct the first building of the St George Technical College on the site of the old Moorefields Racecourse. The building is located at the corner of President Avenue and Princes Highway, Kogarah. This college is now (in 2007) integrated into a broader TAFE system.

== Sylvania Waters ==
James' business won the contract to construct the suburb on the new Hooker Estate east of Sylvania Waters, on Georges River. He was responsible for the design, construction of dwellings and promotion of the new suburb.

== Family background ==
James Nicholas Jimmy Goyen was born in Surry Hills and died in Kogarah. He was the son of Nicholas Goyen and Eliza Mary Snow Aspinall, daughter of the builder Albert Aspinall. Although his birth was registered as "Nicholas" James was baptised as "James Albert", the name he used throughout his life and in his business name. He only found his registered name by accident later in life. Jimmy, his wife, Mary, and their four daughters lived at several addresses in Bexley and at 2 George Street, Rockdale before moving to Cronulla.
