= USS Onward (SP-311) =

Patrol vessel of the United States Navy

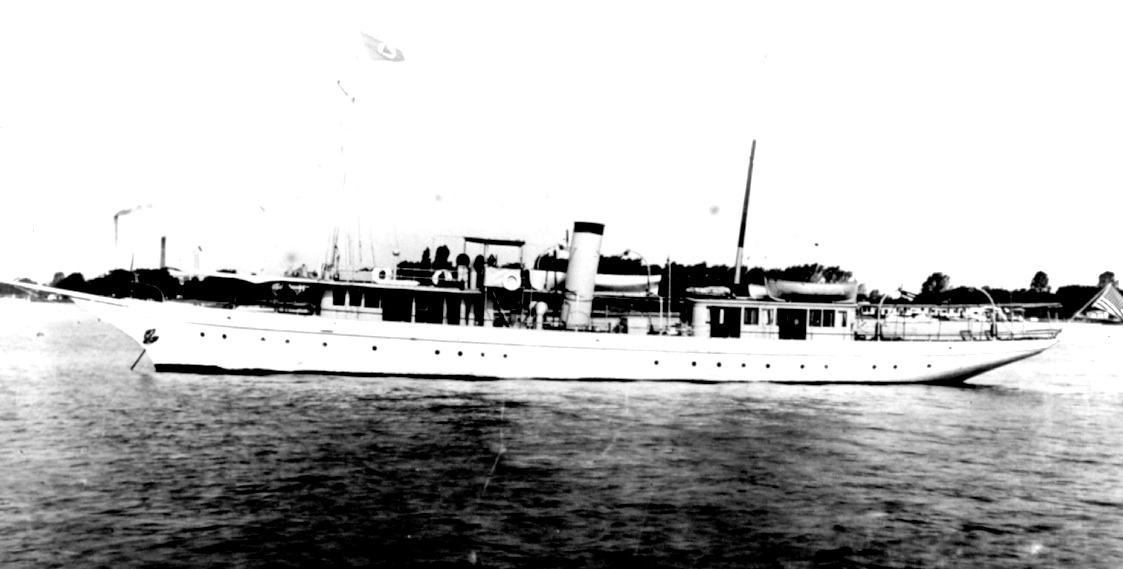
- Coast and Geodetic Survey Ship Onward. This vessel was received from the Navy following World War I and served with the C&GS for a short time before being returned to the Navy in 1920. Hampton, Virginia 1919. (Image ID: ship0547, NOAA's Fleet Then and Now – Sailing for Science Collection)

History

United States
- Name: USS Onward (SP-311)/USC&GS Onward, ex Ungava, ex Galatea
- Builder: Consolidated Shipbuilding (consolidating Charles L. Seabury Co. and Gas Engine & Power Co.), Morris Heights, Bronx, New York
- Launched: 1908
- Acquired: Navy: 1 August 1917 USC&GS: 18 April 1919
- Commissioned: Navy: 22 September 1917
- Decommissioned: 18 April 1919
- In service: USC&GS 19 April 1919
- Out of service: USC&GS 26 November 1920
- Fate: Wrecked in April 1923 on south end of Fishers Island, New York as the rum runner Thelma Phoebe.

General characteristics
- Tonnage: 157
- Length: 140 ft 0 in (42.67 m)
- Beam: 17 ft 5 in (5.31 m)
- Draught: 6 ft 10.5 in (2.096 m)
- Speed: 13.8 knots
- Complement: 43 (Navy)
- Armament: 2 6–pdrs., 2 mg. (Navy)

USS Onward (SP-311), a former yacht named Galatea and then Ungava was a patrol yacht acquired by the U.S. Navy during World War I. She was transferred to the United States Coast and Geodetic Survey where she served briefly until return to the Navy for a brief time before her disposal by sale. She was renamed Thelma Phoebe.

== Construction & specifications ==
The vessel was built as the yacht Galatea, hull number 211, for E. Leydon Ford in 1906 (Note: Date of 1908 is given in DANFS & NavSource. The 1906 date is given by Shipbuilding History with detail and by the Naval History and Heritage Command Online Library of Selected Images page.) by Charles L. Seabury Co. and Gas Engine & Power Co., later Consolidated Shipbuilding, Morris Heights, New York The 157-ton ship was 140 ft 0 in (42.67 m) in length with a 17 ft 5 in (5.31 m) beam and draft of 6 ft 10.5 in (2.096 m). The yacht was powered by a Seabury triple expansion engine and boiler with steel frames, stem, deck beams and plating.

== Yacht ==
Owner E. Leydon Ford sailed Galatea by way of the St. Lawrence to Detroit, Michigan to become part of the "Detroit fleet." The yacht was then purchased by Sylvester W. Labrot and renamed Ungava.

== Naval service ==
Ungava was purchased from Sylvester W. Labrot by the Navy on 1 August 1917, commissioned as USS Onward (SP-311) 22 September 1917 at Norfolk, Virginia. For naval service the vessel had a complement of 43 and was armed with two 6-pounder guns and two machine guns. Onward patrolled the entrance of Chesapeake Bay between Cape Henry and Cape Charles until transfer.

== Coast and Geodetic Survey ==
Onward was transferred to the U.S. Coast and Geodetic Survey 18 April 1919 as USC&GS Onward. On 19 April 1919 the steamer was put into service, after repairs, using the crew from the USC&GS schooner Matchless, which had been surveyed and condemned, with the task of continuing surveys of that ship in the York River and west shore of Chesapeake Bay.

The ship completed surveys in Hampton Roads, Virginia and transited to Doboy Sound in Georgia for surveys until going into Savannah, Georgia for repairs, 25 December 1919 through 8 March 1920. From Savannah she proceeded to the Neuse River, North Carolina area under the command of Jean Hodgkins Hawley, later Rear Admiral and assistant director of the Coast and Geodetic Survey, the vessel began surveys of the Neuse River and Pamlico Sound, North Carolina. She required emergency repairs and was in Elizabeth City, North Carolina from 1–16 July, returned to work and suffered a boiler casualty requiring tow into Oriental, North Carolina until 22 July. On resumption survey work included erection of shore signals, correcting the position of the Neuse River light, triangulation and charting the shoreline, tide and current measurements and hydrography. On 21 October 1920 the ship broke from surveys to Norfolk, Virginia where the ship was prepared for return to the Navy. On 23 November 1920 the ship transited to the Naval Operating Base, Hampton, Virginia for transfer on 26 November 1920.

The report of the survey in Doboy Sound noted the vessel had to suspend work due to weather and "the weakened condition of the vessel, which made it hazardous to leave protected waters during stormy weather" even after repairs had been made in Savannah. In the Director's introduction concerning the backlog of surveys from the war years and the lack of vessels, in part made up by transfer of Navy vessels, he noted the first season's work "showed conclusively that, with one or two exceptions, they were absolutely unsuitable for the work" and two had been rejected with one being returned "this winter."

== Rum Runner & Fate ==
After return to the Navy 26 November 1920 the vessel was apparently disposed of by sale. She grounded and wrecked as Thelma Phoebe, while rum running, in April 1923 on south end of Fishers Island, New York. She was headed to Rum Row off Sandy Hook from the Bahamas when she grounded with "a cargo of liquor valued at a quarter of a million dollars" with reports the Scotch from the wreck had been liberated by local residents.
