= SS Stanley =

History
- Name: Stanley
- Completed: April 1859
- Fate: Wrecked on the Black Middens on 24 November 1864

General characteristics
- Class & type: Steam ship
- Tonnage: 376
- Tons burthen: 552
- Propulsion: screw

SS Stanley was an iron sailing steam ship built by Pile, Spence & Co. in West Hartlepool in 1859. It was wrecked on the Black Middens during a gale on 24 November 1864.
