= Greyhound-class sloop =

Class overview
- Name: Greyhound-class sloops
- Builders: Pembroke Royal Dockyard; Deptford Royal Dockyard
- Operators: Royal Navy
- Cost: £41,394 (Greyhound) – £30,874 (Mutine)
- Built: 1859
- In commission: 1859–1869
- Completed: 2
- Lost: 0

General characteristics
- Class & type: Wooden screw sloop
- Displacement: 1,260 tons
- Tons burthen: 877 53/94 bm
- Length: 172 ft 6 in (52.58 m) (gundeck); 172 ft 6 in (52.58 m) (keel)
- Beam: 33 ft 2 in (10.11 m)
- Installed power: 200 nhp
- Propulsion: Two-cylinder horizontal single-expansion steam engine; Single screw
- Sail plan: Barque-rigged
- Speed: 6.6 to 8.8 kn (12.2 to 16.3 km/h) under power
- Complement: 160
- Armament: 5 × 40-pounder breech-loading gun; 12 × 32-pounder muzzle-loading cannon

The Greyhound class was a development of the Cruizer-class sloop, and comprised two 17-gun wooden screw sloops. They were both launched in 1859 and saw service with the Royal Navy until 1870. The class was reclassified as corvettes in 1862.

== Design ==
The Greyhound class were a lengthened version of the wooden sloops of the Cruizer class, with an uprated steam engine. The combination of greater length (allowing greater hydrodynamic efficiency) and more power gave an increase in top speed from 6 knots in the Cruizers to 10 knots in the Greyhounds.

=== Propulsion ===
Their two-cylinder horizontal single-expansion steam engines generated an indicated horsepower of between 743 ihp (554 kW) and 786 ihp (586 kW); driving a single screw, this gave a maximum speed of between 9.7 knots (18.0 km/h) and 10.2 knots (18.9 km/h).

=== Sail plan ===
Both ships of the class were built with a barque-rig sail plan.

=== Armament ===
Both ships of the class were provided with five 40-pounder breech-loading guns and twelve 32-pounder muzzle-loading smoothbore carriage guns in a broadside arrangement.

== Ships ==
Name	Ship Builder	Launched	Fate
Greyhound	Pembroke Royal Dockyard	15 June 1859	Reduced to harbour service in September 1869 and used as a breakwater at Devonport. Sold on 3 April 1906
Mutine	Deptford Royal Dockyard	30 July 1859	Originally ordered as the seventh vessel of the Cruizer class. Sold on 26 February 1870 for commercial use. Renamed Chieftain.

== Operational histories ==
=== HMS Greyhound ===
HMS Greyhound (1859) was commissioned at Plymouth on 6 February 1860 and served in the Mediterranean until 1861. From 1861 to 1864 she was sent to the North America and West Indies Station, and during her commission from 1865 to 1869 she served on the west coast of Africa and the south-east coast of South America. She was reduced to harbour service in 1869, and in 1871 and 1872 she conducted hydrodynamic experiments to support the work of William Froude. By 1879 she was being used as a breakwater at Devonport, and she was eventually sold on 3 April 1906.

=== HMS Mutine ===
HMS Mutine (1859) was commissioned at Woolwich on 26 November 1859 and, apart from a refit at Woolwich in 1864–1865, served her entire career on the Pacific Station. She paid off at Sheerness on 30 March 1869 and was sold on 26 February 1870 for commercial use. She was renamed Chieftain by her new owners.
