= USC&GS Matchless =

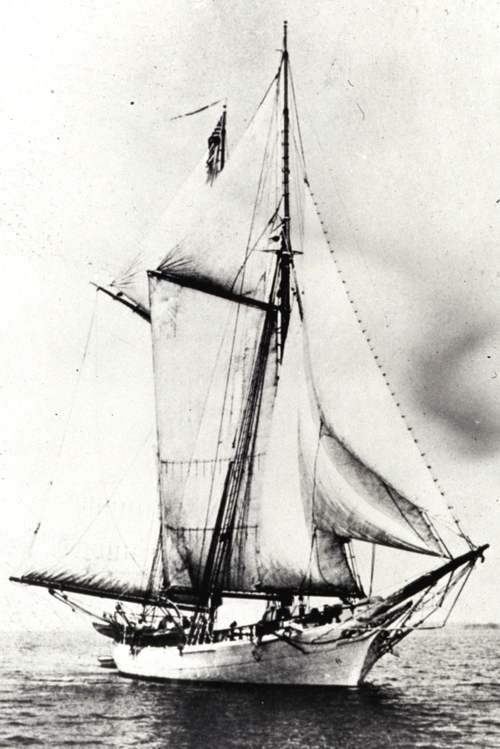
- USC&GS Matchless. This is the only known photograph of a United States Coast and Geodetic Survey sailing vessel under sail.

History

United States
- Name: Matchless
- Completed: 1859; rebuilt 1895
- Commissioned: 1885
- Decommissioned: 1919
- Fate: Sold June 28, 1919

General characteristics
- Type: Survey ship
- Length: 99.6 ft (30.4 m)
- Beam: 24.9 ft (7.6 m)
- Draft: 7.6 ft (2.3 m)
- Propulsion: Sails
- Sail plan: Schooner-rigged

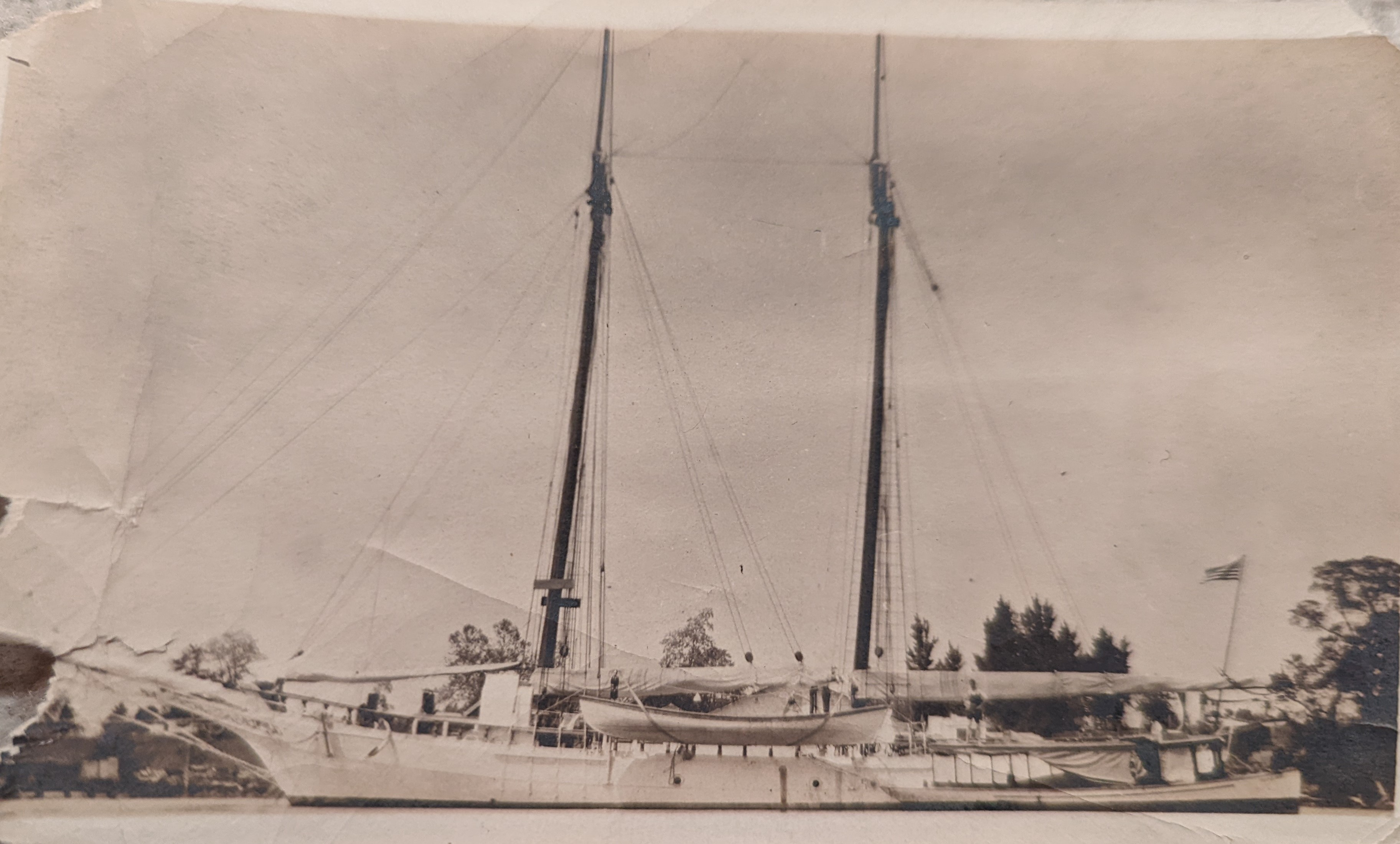
USC&GS Matchless.

USC&GS Matchless was a wood, two masted schooner that served as a survey ship in the United States Coast and Geodetic Survey from 1885 to 1919. She was the only Coast and Geodetic Survey ship to bear the name and the last sailing vessel owned and operated by the Survey.

Matchless was built at Key West, Florida, in 1859. The Coast and Geodetic Survey acquired her in 1885 and placed her in service that year. She was rebuilt at a cost of $50,000 (USD) in 1895.

Matchless was in the Philippines during the early 1910s.

On February 28, 1915, officers and crew of Matchless helped put out a fire on Main Street in Edenton, North Carolina. On September 16, 1917, she helped the steamer White Wings off a shoal.

While returning from Roanoke Island to Elizabeth City, North Carolina after completion of work in Croatan and Roanoke Sounds the Matchless was caught and held in ice from about December 24, 1917 until January 17, 1918. The ship then engaged in surveys requested by the Navy in the lower Chesapeake Bay, the York River and Mattaponi River during the first half of 1918.

In her last years Matchless was used "as a house-boat" from which parties surveyed inland waters. She was surveyed and condemned in 1919, retired from Coast and Geodetic Survey service and sold June 28, 1919. The crew from the Matchless transferred to the steamer USC&GS Onward with the task of continuing the surveys in the York River and west shore of Chesapeake Bay.
