= Hirael =

Suburb of Bangor, Gwynedd, North West Wales

Coordinates: 53.233723°N 4.119770°W

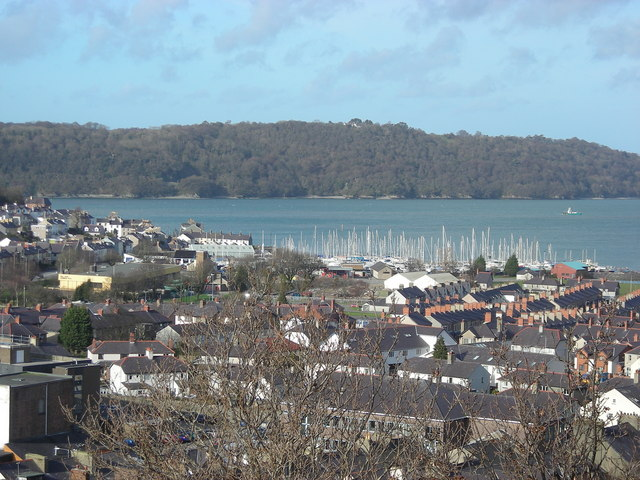
- Skyline of Hirael Bay in 2007

- Location within Gwynedd
- Population: 1,183
- Principal area: Gwynedd
- Preserved county: Gwynedd
- Country: Wales
- Sovereign state: United Kingdom
- Post town: BANGOR
- Postcode district: LL57
- Police: North Wales
- Fire: North Wales
- Ambulance: Welsh
- UK Parliament: Ynys Môn
- Senedd Cymru – Welsh Parliament: Bangor Conwy Môn

Hirael is a coastal suburb and ward of Bangor in Gwynedd, North West Wales. The area is notable for Hirael Bay on the Menai Strait.

Hirael lies directly northeast of Bangor city centre. Adjacent to the district is Port Penrhyn and directly opposite the district on the neighbouring Isle of Anglesey is Beaumaris.
