= Green Cape, New South Wales =

Locality on the far south coast of New South Wales

Coordinates: 37.258°S 150.046°E

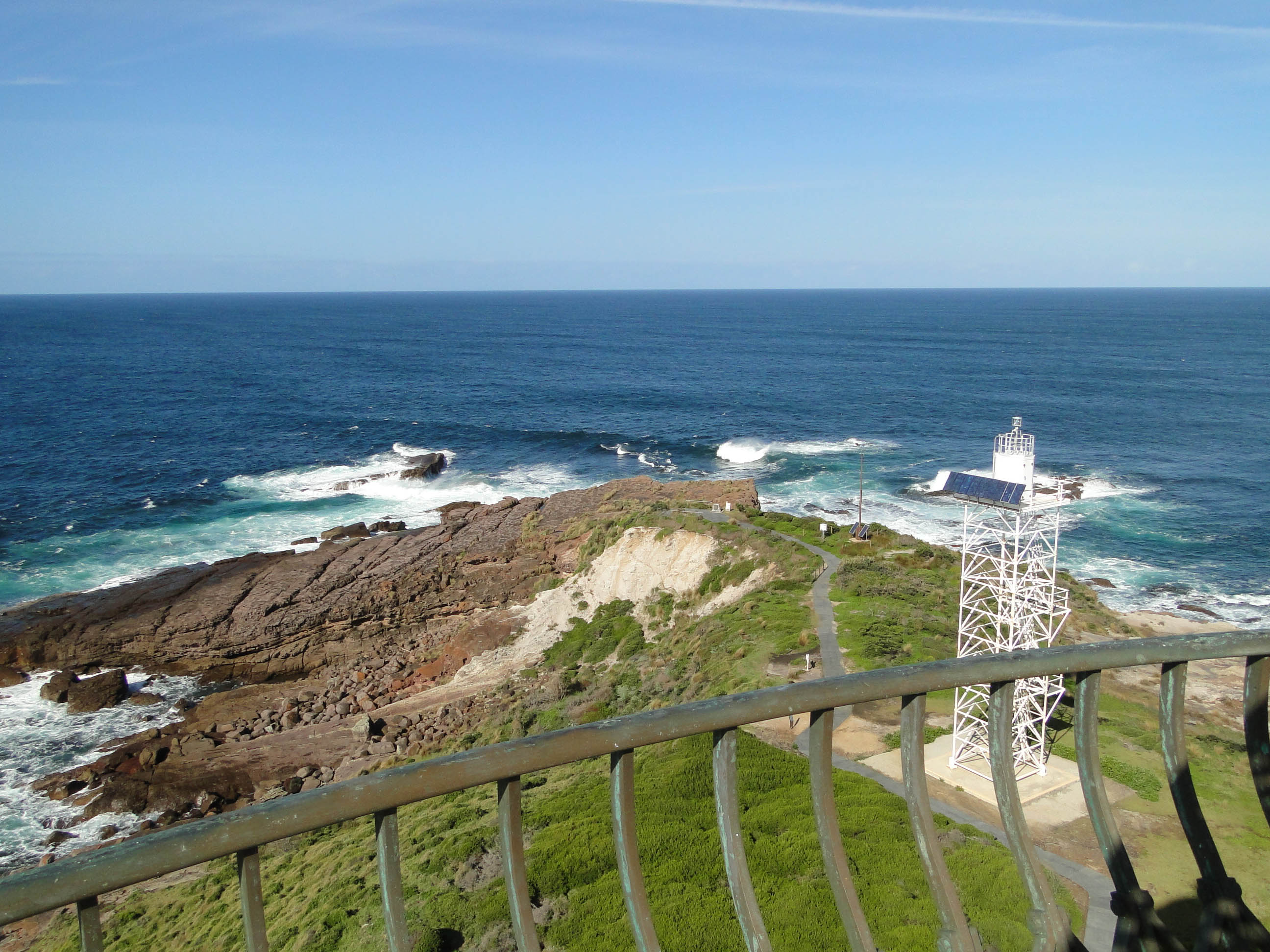
Green Cape viewed from the lighthouse.

Green Cape is a locality situated on the eponymous headland or cape on the far south coast of New South Wales. It is located at 37° 15' S 150° 03' E, within Beowa National Park, south of Eden, New South Wales. The headland forms the northern boundary of Disaster Bay.

== History ==
The first vessel recorded shipwrecked at Green Cape was the City of Sydney which struck the cape in fog on 6 October 1862 with more than 100 passengers on board. All passengers and crew boarded lifeboats and made it safely ashore.

The Green Cape Lighthouse, the southernmost lighthouse in New South Wales, completed in 1883, was mostly constructed by Albert Aspinall, who constructed a 7 kilometres (4.3 mi) wooden tramway from the nearest landfall at Bittangabee Bay for the purpose.

On 31 May 1886 The SS Ly-Ee-Moon en route to Sydney from Melbourne, struck a reef close to the cape at night. Seventy-one souls were lost, with the lighthouse keepers only being able to save 15 people under the conditions.

== Climate ==
Green Cape has an oceanic climate (Cfb) with mild to warm summers and cool winters. Due to the foehn effect, it features more clear days annually (67.9) than Melbourne (48.6 days), in addition to being warmer in winter.

Climate data for Green Cape AWS
Month	Jan	Feb	Mar	Apr	May	Jun	Jul	Aug	Sep	Oct	Nov	Dec	Year
Record high °C (°F)	30.1 (86.2)	33.1 (91.6)	37.4 (99.3)	33.2 (91.8)	25.2 (77.4)	21.6 (70.9)	23.9 (75.0)	26.6 (79.9)	30.3 (86.5)	34.4 (93.9)	34.7 (94.5)	33.7 (92.7)	37.4 (99.3)
Mean daily maximum °C (°F)	23.7 (74.7)	23.7 (74.7)	22.6 (72.7)	20.9 (69.6)	18.2 (64.8)	16.2 (61.2)	15.5 (59.9)	16.1 (61.0)	17.7 (63.9)	19.1 (66.4)	20.6 (69.1)	22.2 (72.0)	19.7 (67.5)
Mean daily minimum °C (°F)	17.5 (63.5)	17.4 (63.3)	16.3 (61.3)	14.7 (58.5)	12.2 (54.0)	10.4 (50.7)	9.2 (48.6)	9.4 (48.9)	10.8 (51.4)	12.2 (54.0)	14.3 (57.7)	15.8 (60.4)	13.4 (56.1)
Record low °C (°F)	11.6 (52.9)	10.7 (51.3)	10.7 (51.3)	8.4 (47.1)	7.6 (45.7)	5.9 (42.6)	−2.0 (28.4)	5.1 (41.2)	5.8 (42.4)	6.6 (43.9)	7.4 (45.3)	9.3 (48.7)	−2.0 (28.4)
Average precipitation mm (inches)	62.7 (2.47)	50.7 (2.00)	51.5 (2.03)	64.6 (2.54)	49.4 (1.94)	57.4 (2.26)	44.9 (1.77)	35.9 (1.41)	37.2 (1.46)	51.4 (2.02)	62.2 (2.45)	50.9 (2.00)	627.2 (24.69)
Average precipitation days	9.6	9.4	10.0	9.2	9.9	10.9	9.6	9.5	10.0	11.4	11.2	9.2	119.9
Average afternoon relative humidity (%)	70	71	69	70	71	71	69	66	69	70	73	69	70

== Heritage listings ==
Green Cape has a number of heritage-listed sites, including:

- Green Cape Road: Green Cape Maritime Precinct
