= Bittangabee Bay =

Bay in New South Wales, Australia

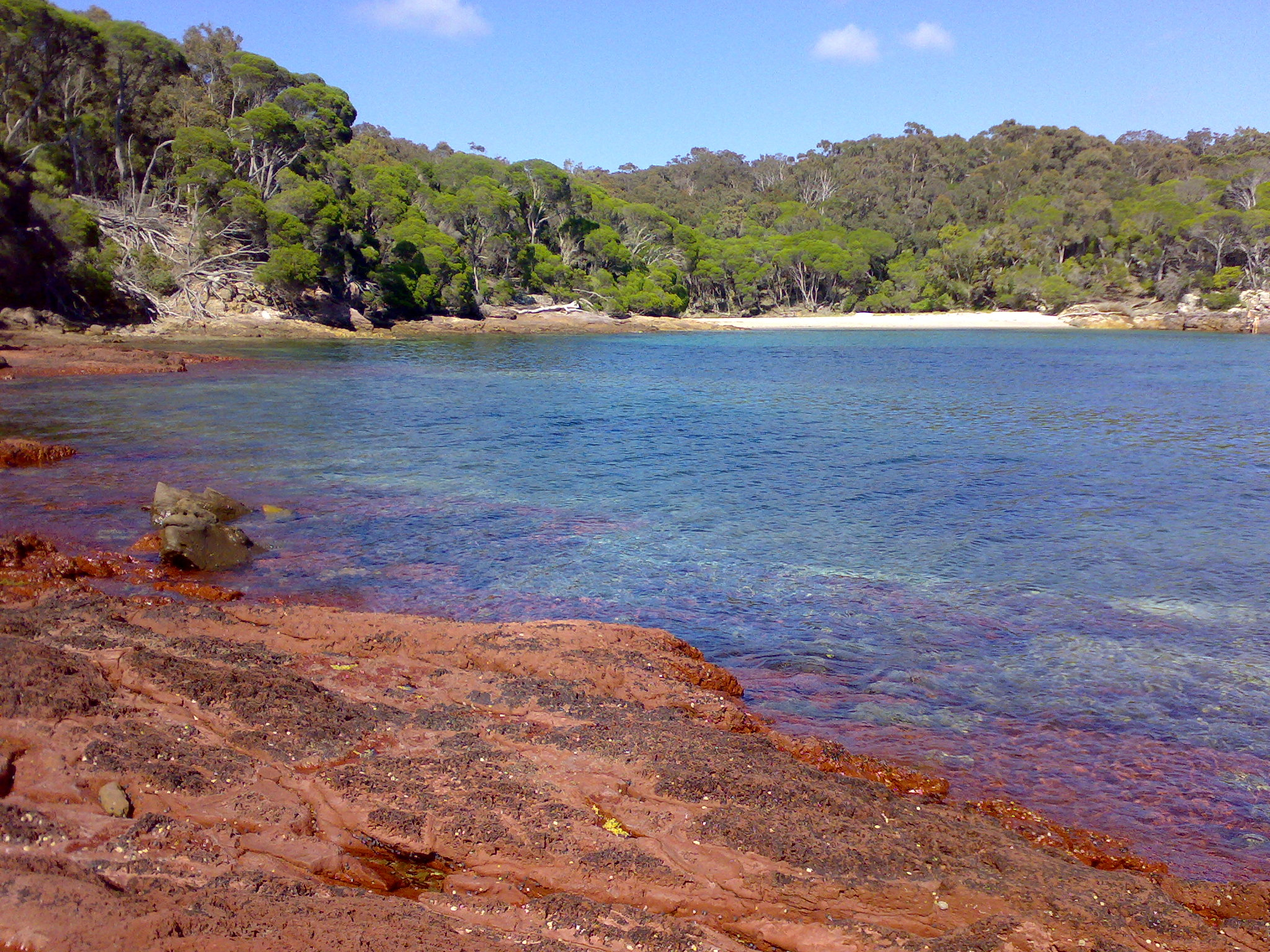

- Coordinates: 37.2149°S 150.0157°E

Bittangabee Bay is a tiny, picturesque bay on the rugged and remote stretch of coastline south of Eden in New South Wales, Australia. The bay is located in Beowa National Park, and there is a campground nearby. The facilities are maintained by National Parks and Wildlife Service (NPWS), Merimbula office. It can be reached by an unsealed road from the Princes Highway. The bay is the only haven between Twofold Bay and Mallacoota Inlet, and passing yachts are seen anchored for the night there most evenings. It is fed by Bittangabee Creek.

== History ==
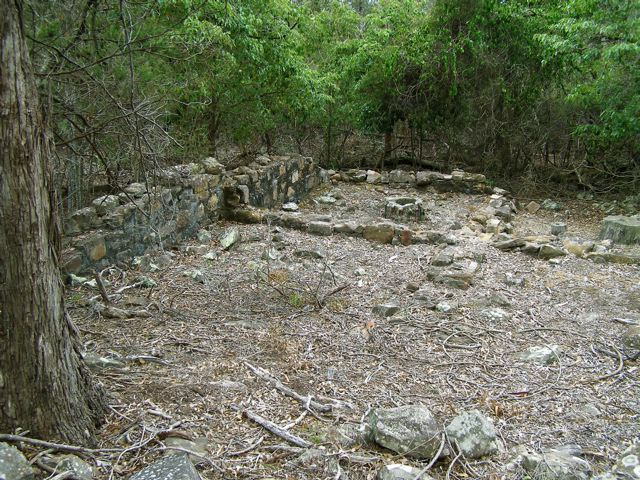
Bittangabee Bay ruins

Bittangabee Bay was significant for the indigenous people of the region, and early European settlement.

Bittangabee Bay was known as 'Pertangerbee' by the original occupants of the area, the Thaua/Thawa/Thauaira people of the Yuin (Murring) nation, who have lived there for over 6,000 years. Naa-chi (now Nadgee Nature Reserve), on the other side of Green Cape to Bittangabee Bay, is the resting-place of their Rainbow Serpent, the most important totem of most Aboriginal people.

Some stone ruins near the shore of the bay date from 1844. In 1977, in his book The Secret Discovery of Australia, Kenneth McIntyre suggested the ruins were of Portuguese origin, and that romantic notion quickly gained credence before it was proven incorrect by historian Michael Pearson.
