= Imlay =

Imlay may refer to:

== People ==
- Chris Imlay, an American musician
- James Henderson Imlay, a United States Representative from New Jersey
- Gilbert Imlay (1754–1828), land speculator, author, intimate of Mary Wollstonecraft
- Fanny Imlay, daughter of Mary Wollstonecraft and Gilbert Imlay
- Three brothers born in Scotland:
  - Alexander Imlay (1794–1847), Australian landowner and speculator
  - George Imlay (c1794–1846), Australian landowner and speculator
  - Peter Imlay (1797–1881), Australian and New Zealand landowner and speculator

== Places ==
- Imlay Township, Michigan
- Imlay City, Michigan
- Imlay, Nevada
- Imlay, South Dakota
- Mount Imlay National Park in Australia
