= Twofold Bay and Maneroo Observer =

Front page of Twofold Bay and Maneroo Observer, October 26, 1860

The Twofold Bay and Maneroo Observer, was an English language newspaper, issued twice weekly, and published in Eden, New South Wales, Australia.

== History ==
The first edition of the paper was issued Friday 26 October 1860 (164 years ago). Publication of the paper is thought to have continued through to 1861 before ceasing sometime before the end of June 1861 (163 years ago). The newspaper was published by J.R. Edwards in competition to Eden's weekly paper, the Twofold Bay and Maneroo Telegraph.

== Digitisation ==
The Twofold Bay and Maneroo Observer has been digitised as part of the Australian Newspapers Digitisation Program of the National Library of Australia.

== See also ==
- List of newspapers in New South Wales
