= Mary Braidwood Mowle =

English born Australian diarist

Mary Braidwood Mowle (1827–1857) was a diarist in 19th-century New South Wales.

She was born on 3 August 1827 at Durham, England and arrived in Sydney with her parents on 24 June 1836.

She began writing a diary in 1850 while living on a farm with her husband near where Canberra was later founded, and continued her diary entries after she moved to Eden.

Mowle died in Balmain, Sydney on 15 September 1857, due to complications from the birth of her sixth child two weeks previously.

Her diaries were preserved and are considered valuable as they provide a female perspective on life in regional Australia at this time.
