= Coast to Kosciuszko =

Ultramarathon race in New South Wales, Australia

- Location: New South Wales, Australia
- Distance: 240 kilometres (150 mi)
- Established: December 2004

Coast to Kosciuszko (C2K) is a 240 kilometres (150 mi) ultramarathon race run each December in New South Wales, Australia. The race commences at Twofold Bay (at sea level) and concludes at Charlotte Pass (1,837 metres (6,027 ft) above sea level) after reaching the summit of Mount Kosciuszko (Australia's highest point at 2,228 metres (7,310 ft) above sea level).

== Results ==
Year	Male winner	Time	No. male runners	Female winner	Time	No. female runners	Course
2004	Paul Every and Jan Herrmann	39:36	4	—	—	0	Summit
2005	Martin Fryer	31:55	7	—	—	0	Summit
2006	Wayne Gregory	33:49	8	Carol La Plant	42:53	1	Summit
2007	Tim Cochrane	27:46:37	18	Allison Lilley	40:27:54	2	Summit
2008	Tim Cochrane	27:19:18	20	Kerrie Bremner	33:08:04	4	Inclement weather*
2009	Jo Blake	26:01:40	20	Pam Muston	32:31:47	7	Summit
2010	Jo Blake	28:45:22	29	Sharon Scholz	32:14:32	9	Summit
2011	Ewan Horsburgh	27:27:20	27	Julia Fatton	30:11:25	9	Summit
2012	Ewan Horsburgh	27:31:51	26	Bernadette Benson	31:49:21	8	Summit
2013	Ewan Horsburgh	25:56:15	22	Jess Baker	30:04:27	9	Summit
2014	Andrew Tuckey	24:33:14	38	Sabina Hamaty	30:14:11	9	Summit
2015	John Pearson	27:35:07	36	Sabina Hamaty	31:14:15	12	Summit
2016	Kevin Muller	27:55:05	34	Susan Keith	31:00:46	9	Summit
2017	Mick Thwaites	24:58:59	29	Katy Anderson	31:08:44	11	Summit
2020	Morgan Lindqvist	26:35:49	41	Joasia Zakrzewski	28:18:53	18	Summit
2022	Rob Mason	27:53:41	26	Maree Connor	30:51:28	13	Cow Bail Trail Detour

- The 'inclement weather course' does not include the (approximately 18 km) return trip from Charlotte Pass to the summit.
