= Red Point (Twofold Bay) =

Headland in New South Wales, Australia

Red Point (37°05′S 149°57′E) is a coastal headland in New South Wales, Australia at the southern end of Twofold Bay.

The point got its name from George Bass's description when he passed it on his whaleboat voyage to Bass Strait in 1797/8. He noted Twofold Bay "may be known by a red point on the south side of the peculiar bluish hue of a drunkard's nose" (i.e. red with a bluish tinge).
