= Alexander Imlay =

Australian pioneer settler

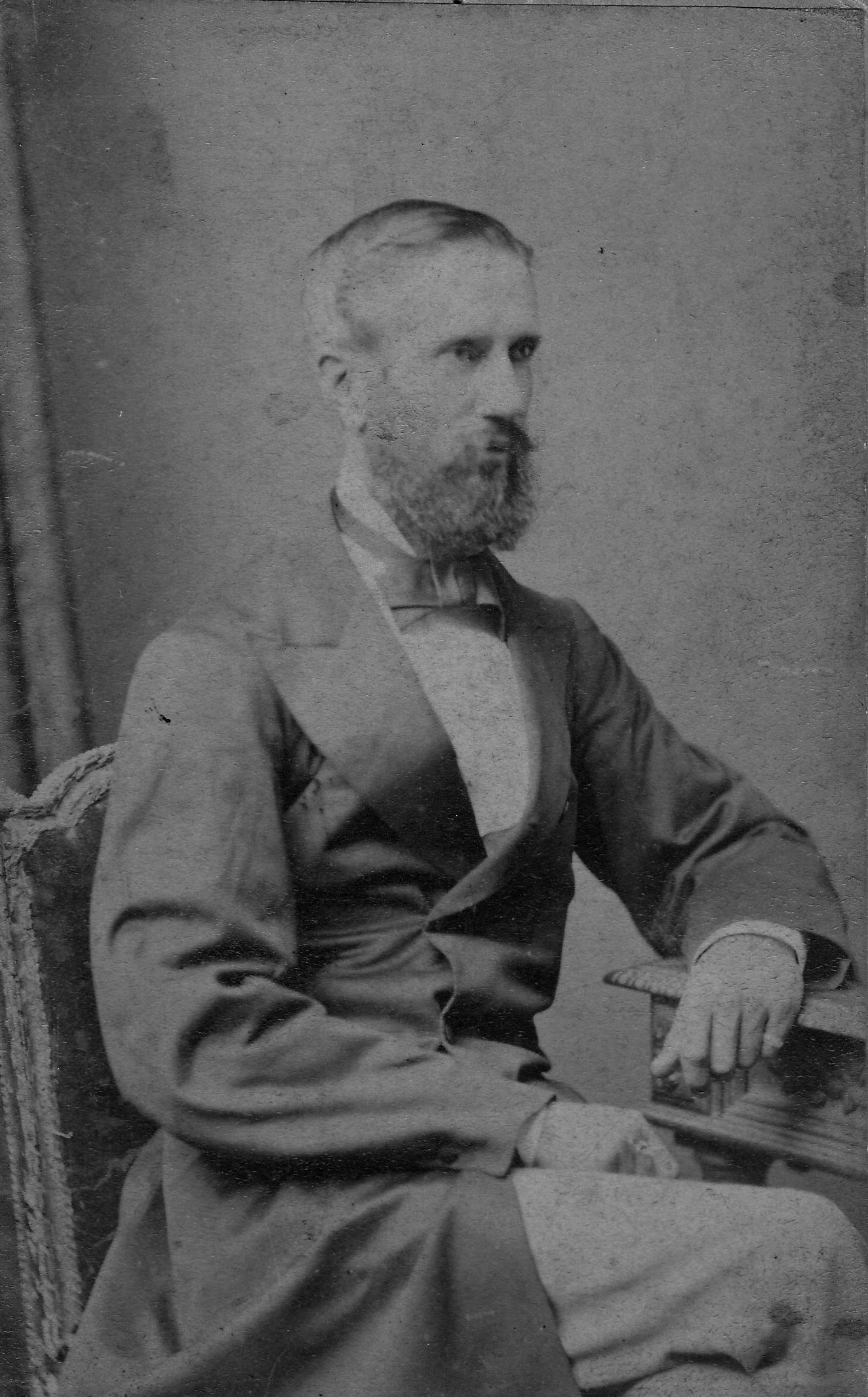
- Alexander Imlay was an early doctor in New South Wales
- Born: Alexander William Imlay; 1800; Scotland
- Died: 31 March 1847 (aged 46–47); New South Wales
- Occupations: Doctor, merchant and pastoralist
- Years active: 1829-1847
- Known for: Pioneer settler

Alexander Imlay (1794 or 1800? – 31 March 1847) was a Scottish-born pioneer settler in southern New South Wales. Alexander and his brothers George (1794?-1846), and Peter (1797–1881) operated in the region as pastoralists, whalers and shipbuilders. A number of things in the area were named after them. These include Imlay Street, the main street in Eden, the Mount Imlay National Park and Imlay Shire (today part of Bega Valley Shire).

== Early life ==
One source says Alexander was born in Scotland and baptised in the parish of Methlick, Aberdeen, on 16 January 1794. His death notice records that he was aged 46 in March 1847, meaning he was born around 1800. The source with the earlier date reports that he attended Aberdeen University and qualified as a surgeon in March 1816. In January 1827 he enlisted as a surgeon in the British army.

Imlay first arrived at Sydney in December 1829 on the Elizabeth, and was working as a government medical officer in the Civil Hospital by March 1830. His brother, George, who also trained as a surgeon, later joined him at the Sydney Infirmary.

In 1831 Imlay journeyed to the Illawarra district and on his return reported a disease resembling smallpox had broken out there among the Aboriginal population. (Although the disease was never endemic on the continent, it was the principal cause of death in Aboriginal populations between 1780 and 1870.) He was on the move again in 1832 when he accompanied Governor (Sir) Richard Bourke (1777-1855) on a tour of inspection of southern New South Wales.

By 1833 Alexander had taken up 1,280 acres (518 hectares) on the Bredalbane plains. Peter and George took up land at Twofold Bay in southern New South Wales near what is now Eden. They operated in the region as pastoralists, whalers, and shipbuilders, and produced casks of tallow and salted meat. The remoteness of the area and the lack of roads meant transport and communication was generally by sea.

== Activities in Tasmania ==
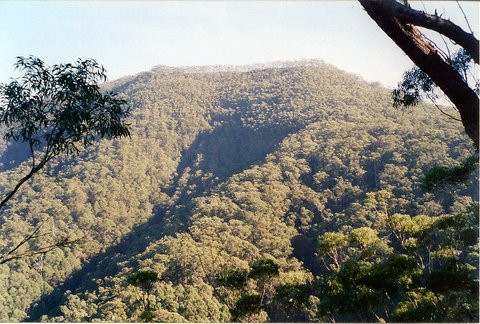
Mount Imlay, June 2001

Alexander Imlay resigned his government post in 1833 and went to Tasmania to act as the local agent in Hobart for his brothers who remained in New South Wales. He arranged for vessels to bring their cattle and sheep from Twofold Bay to Tasmania. These shipments were well received and he was soon supplying most of the retail butchers in Hobart. Some of the ships were used as bay whalers in the winter months. He operated a number of shore-based whaling stations in Tasmania, and his brothers did the same at Twofold Bay. Alexander had one or two pastoral properties in Tasmania. He married Sophia Atkins in Hobart and the couple had four children.

== Later life and legacy ==
The brothers experienced financial difficulties in the economic depression that began in 1840, and handed their 200,000 acres (81,000 ha) cattle run to the Walker brothers, who built a four-roomed Georgian mansion there, naming the property Kameruka, meaning "wait till we return". They sold the property, 21 km south-west of Bega, to the Twofold Bay Pastoral Company in 1852, and ended up with the Tooth family.

Alexander left Tasmania and joined his brothers at Twofold Bay. George had an incurable disease and shot himself in December 1846. Alexander died in 1847 at his brother (presumably Peter)'s home. Peter moved to New Zealand in 1851 and lived there for 30 years.

Among the things named after Imlay brothers in the New South Wales area is Imlay Street, the main street in Eden, the Mount Imlay National Park and Imlay Shire (absorbed into Bega Valley Shire in 1981).
