= George Imlay =

Scottish pioneer in Australia (1794–1846)

- Born: 1794; Aberdeen, Scotland
- Died: 26 December 1846 (aged 51–52); Bega, New South Wales
- Cause of death: Self-inflicted gunshot
- Body discovered: by Peter Imlay after a 4-day search
- Occupations: Surgeon and pastoralist
- Notable work: pioneer settler in southern NSW

George Imlay (1794–1846), together with his brothers Alexander (1794–1847) and Peter (1797–1881), was a Scottish-born pioneer settler in southern New South Wales. All three reached Australia as military surgeons serving on convict ships. They operated in the region as pastoralists, whalers and shipbuilders.

The Australian Dictionary of Biography says George Imlay was born in 1794. If this is correct, he and Alexander were probably twins. George trained in medicine and became a naval surgeon. While in the navy he served on the three-deck naval warship Britannia. Ports he visited while on that vessel include Algiers and Halifax, Nova Scotia. On one occasion he had to act as a second in a duel between two fellow officers one of who was Lieutenant Baldwin Walker.

He sailed to Australia as a Royal Navy surgeon-superintendent, in charge of the medical care of prisoners on the convict transport Roslin Castle, in February 1833. George joined his brother Alexander on the staff at the Sydney Infirmary. He later joined his brothers in their pastoral, whaling and shipping activities in southern New South Wales.

In January 1838 George Imlay voyaged to South Australia with livestock. While there he joined with an acquaintance, John Hill, to undertake an exploration. They became some of the first Europeans to cross and re-cross the central Mount Lofty Ranges. Commencing from the Torrens Gorge at Athelstone they explored the headwaters of this river, passing through the Birdwood and Palmer districts, to reach the Murray River at Mannum. Despite discovering and describing many important geographical features within the region, they did not bestow any placenames.

== Later life and legacy ==
George Imlay was appointed a magistrate in April 1842, and was a Justice of the Peace by August 1844. By mid 1844 he was reported to employ 100 men, and to control 1,500 square miles of land near Bega, described as, "superior to any in the Colony." The brothers experienced financial difficulties in the economic depression that began in 1840. They surrendered much of their property to creditors in 1844 and 1845.

George contracted an incurable disease, and fatally shot himself on what became known as Dr. George Mountain, overlooking Bega on the shores of Twofold Bay on 26 December 1846. He had never married.

Among the things named after Imlay brothers in the New South Wales area are Imlay Street, the main street in Eden, the Mount Imlay National Park and Imlay Shire (absorbed into Bega Valley Shire in 1981).
