= Brett Kelly (rugby league) =

Australian rugby league footballer

Personal information
- Full name: Brett Kelly
- Born: 27 February 1983 (age 43) Eden, New South Wales, Australia
- Height: 183 cm (6 ft 0 in)
- Weight: 92 kg (14 st 7 lb)

Playing information
- Position: Centre, Wing
Club
Years	Team	Pld	T	G	FG	P
2006	Cronulla-Sutherland	1	0	0	0	0
2007–10	Canberra Raiders	20	8	0	0	32
2010–11	SO Avignon	30	37	6	0	160
	Total	51	45	6	0	192
Representative
Years	Team	Pld	T	G	FG	P
2008	Queensland Residents	1	0	0	0	0
- Source: As of 4 January 2024

Brett Kelly born in Australia is a former rugby league footballer who last played for SO Avignon in the Elite One Championship. Kelly previously played with the Canberra Raiders and Cronulla Sharks in the NRL.

Brett Kelly's position of choice is as a centre. However, the majority of his NRL matches were on the wing.

Kelly scored 22 tries and a total of 190 points for Souths Logan Magpies in the Queensland Cup from 2008-2010. He represented the Queensland Residents against NSW Residents in 2009 at Suncorp Stadium.
