= Roslin Castle (1819 ship) =

History

United Kingdom
- Name: Roslin Castle
- Namesake: Roslin Castle
- Builder: Bristol
- Launched: 1819

General characteristics
- Tons burthen: 450 (bm)
- Length: 116 ft (35 m)
- Beam: 29 ft 5 in (8.97 m)
- Propulsion: Sail

Roslin Castle (also called Roslyn Castle) was a barque of 450 tons built in 1819 at Bristol. She was a merchant ship that also made five voyages transporting convicts to Australia. Described as a single decker, her hull was sheathed in copper in 1823 and was sheathed in patent felt and copper over-boards in 1828. She later served as a whaling vessel out of Sydney, Australia.

== Career ==
In early 1828, she traded in Jamaican waters.

First convict voyage (1828): Captain John Duff sailed Roslin Castle from The Downs on 19 August 1828 and arrived at Hobart Town on 16 December. She had embarked 176 male convicts; two convicts died during the voyage.

Second convict voyage (1830): Captain Henry Ferguson sailed from The Downs on 3 March 1830. She lost her main mast and mizzen top mast in a sudden squall off St. Paul's on 3 June. The ship became leaky and the confines were constantly wet. She arrived at Port Jackson on 29 June. She had embarked 128 female convicts, none of whom died on the voyage.

Third convict voyage (1832–1833): Captain William Richards sailed from Cork, Ireland, on 8 October 1832 and arrived at Port Jackson on 16 December. She had embarked 195 male convicts; one convict died during the voyage. The surgeon-superintendent on this voyage was George Imlay.

Fourth convict voyage (1834): Captain Richards left London on 22 May 1834 and arrived at Port Jackson on 15 September. Roslin Castle had embarked 232 male convicts. Three convicts died during the voyage.

Fifth convict voyage (1835–1836): Captain Richards left Cork on 28 October 1835. She arrived at Port Jackson on 25 February 1836. Roslin Castle had embarked 165 female convicts. Three convicts died during the voyage.

In March 1836, it was announced in the press the vessel was to be fitted out for a whaling voyage to Cloudy Bay, New Zealand, under charter to Messrs Long & Co.

A whaling voyage (1836–1837): Roslyn Castle departed Sydney 29 April 1836 under the command of Captain William Richards for New Zealand. She first went to Akaroa and by 15 June was reported at Cloudy Bay with "1 fish." Then it was to the Chatham Islands before going to Kapiti where they arrived on 13 July. The vessel was reported off the Three Kings, at the Bay of Islands, at Banks Peninsula and elsewhere off the coast of New Zealand. She returned to Sydney 7 November 1837 with a reported 3,500 barrels of oil aboard, of which 500 was sperm whale oil, plus 12 tons of “whale bone” (baleen). This was declared by The Sydney Gazette to be, "the largest cargo we believe ever brought into this port from our whale fishery.”.

On 2 August 1838, the vessel was purchased in Sydney for £2,200 by Robert Duke & Co. At first it was planned to send her whaling again. This was changed instead to a voyage to London. She departed Sydney 20 January 1839 for London, with a general cargo and a few passengers.
