= Peter Imlay =

Australian pioneer settler (1797–1881)

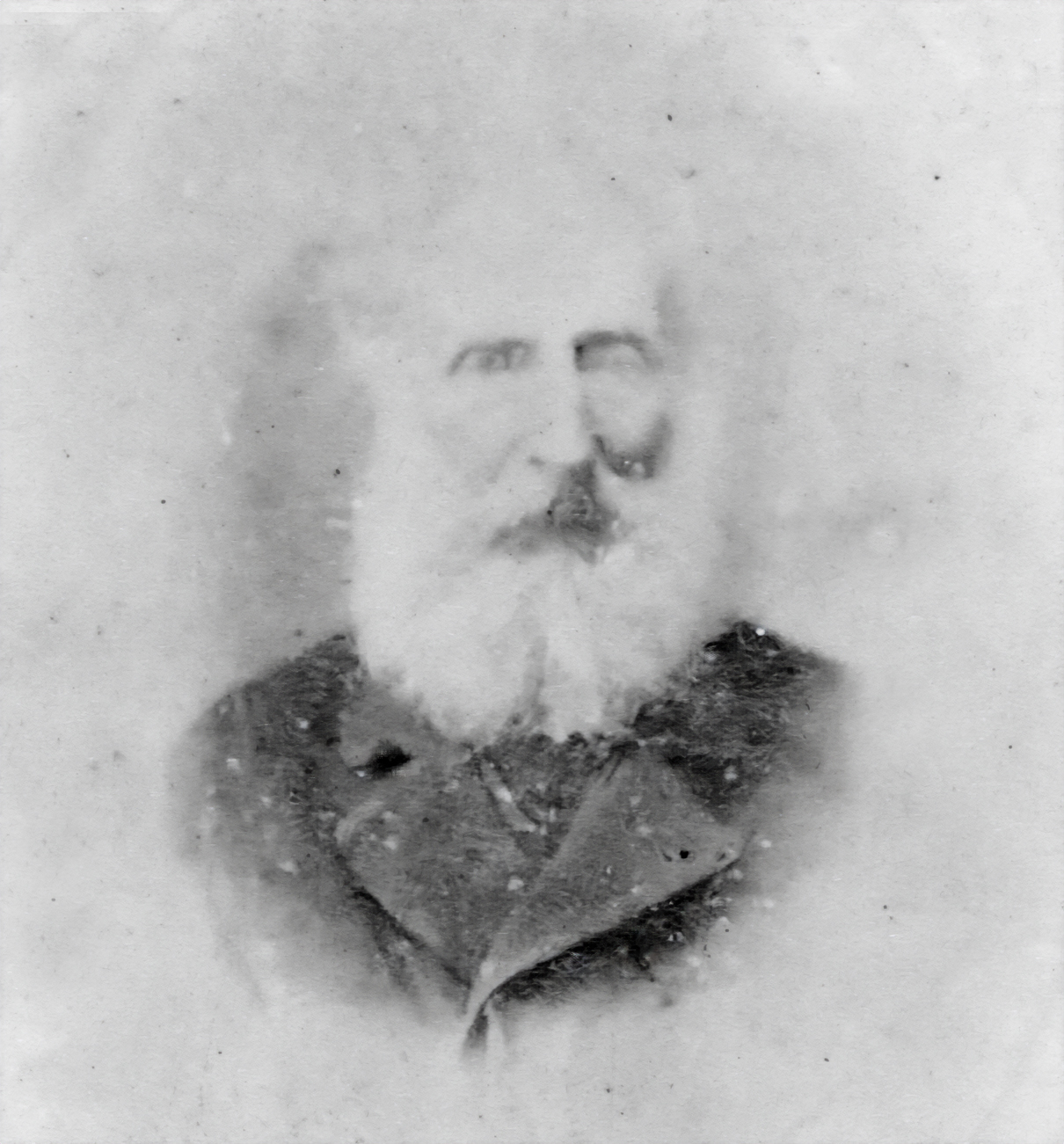
- Peter Imlay, New South Wales, 1867-1881
- Born: 1797; Aberdeen, Scotland
- Died: 8 March 1881 (aged 83–84); Wanganui, New Zealand
- Occupations: Pastoralist, shipowner and merchant
- Known for: Pioneer settlement in Twofold Bay area

Peter Imlay (1797–1881) was a Scottish-born pioneer settler in southern New South Wales. Peter and his brothers Alexander (1794-1847) and George (1794?-1846) operated in the region as pastoralists, whalers and shipbuilders.

== Life and career ==
Peter Imlay was baptised on 22 January 1797 at Aberdeen, Scotland. He came to Australia aboard the sailing ship Greenock, reaching Hobart Town in February 1830. He was an inspector of stock at Launceston by July 1830.

He and his brothers took up 3,885 square km of land near Twofold Bay in southern New South Wales. The brothers experienced financial difficulties in the economic depression that began in 1840. These saw them lose most of the land.

Imlay was on the chartered Hobart vessel Breeze, sailing from Tahiti to New Zealand, when the vessel was wrecked at Upolu, Samoa, in July 1846 with no loss of life. George died at Twofold Bay in 1846, and Alexander in 1847.

Imlay married Jane McGuire on 23 February 1853 at St Andrews Presbyterian Church in Sydney. He and his family moved to New Zealand in 1851 and settled at Balgownie, Wanganui. He died there on 8 March 1881, survived by his wife and three daughters.

== Legacy ==
Among the things named after the Imlay brothers in the New South Wales area is Imlay Street (the main street in Eden), Imlay Creek, the Mount Imlay National Park and Imlay Shire (absorbed into Bega Valley Shire in 1981). In New Zealand, Imlay Parish, in the County of Auckland, bears his surname.
