= Imlay, South Dakota =

Unincorporated community in South Dakota, U.S.

Coordinates: 43°43′10″N 102°23′51″W

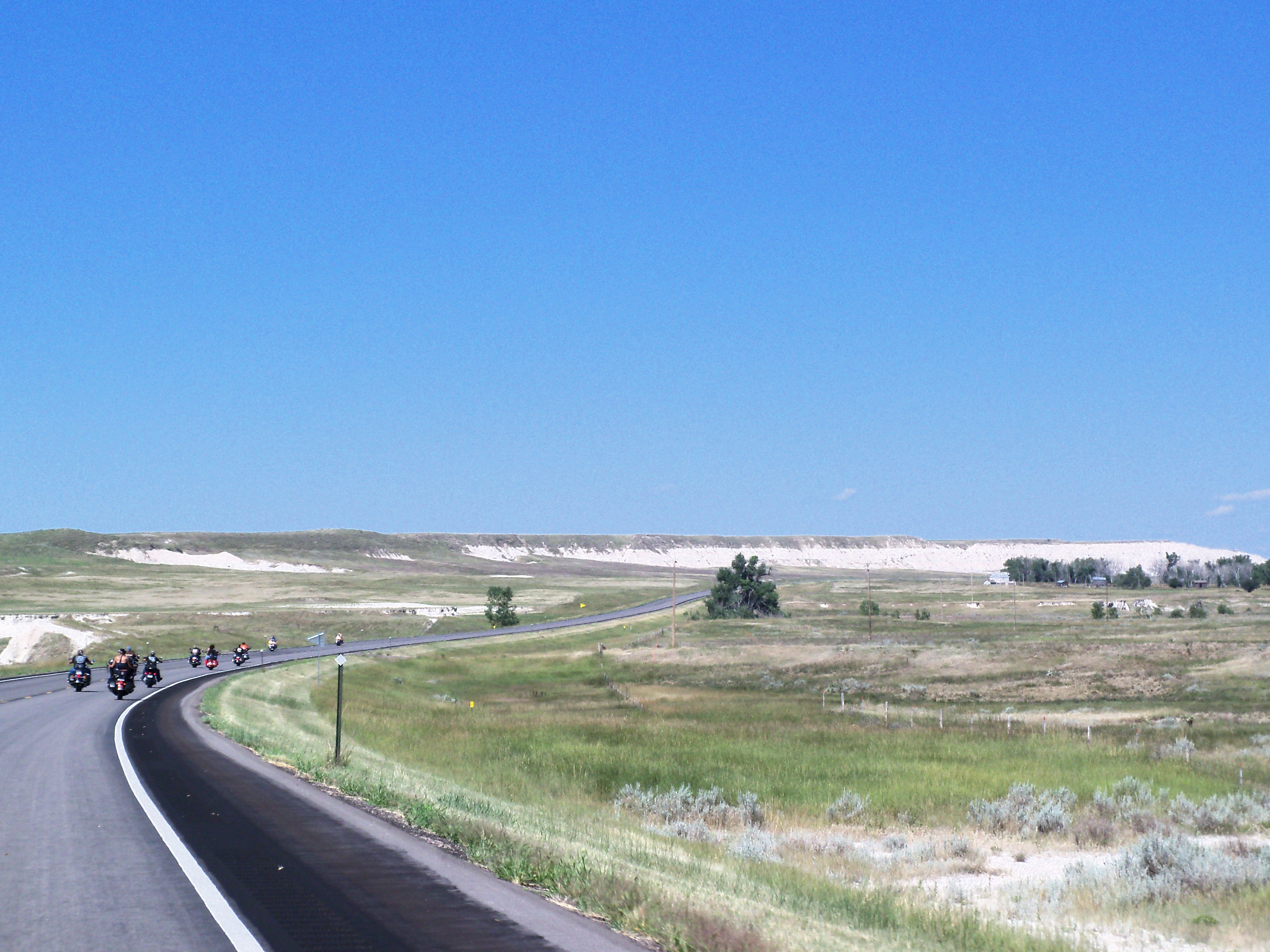
Highway in Imlay

Imlay is an unincorporated community in Pennington County, in the U.S. state of South Dakota.

== History ==
A post office called Imlay was in operation between 1908 and 1951. The community was named for Imlay Tabbets, a local cattleman.
