= Eden, New South Wales =

Eden
- Town
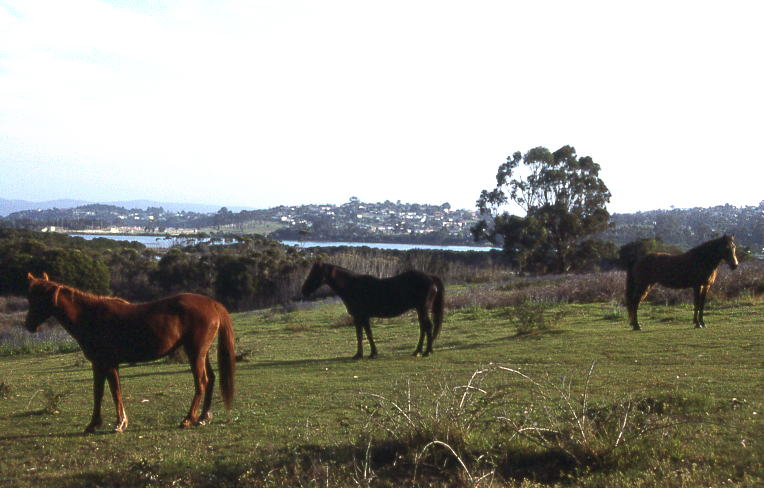
- Horses and the town in the background

- Coordinates: 37°04′0″S 149°54′0″E
- Country: Australia
- State: New South Wales
- LGA: Bega Valley Shire
- Location: 478 km (297 mi) S of Sydney; 555 km (345 mi) ENE of Melbourne; 278 km (173 mi) SE of Canberra; 54 km (34 mi) S of Bega; 275 km (171 mi) ENE of Bairnsdale

Government
  - State electorate: Bega
  - Federal division: Eden-Monaro
- Elevation: 43 m (141 ft)

Population
  - Total: 3,425 (2021 census)
- Postcode: 2551
- County: Auckland

Eden (/ˈiːdən/ EE-dən) is a coastal town in the South Coast region of New South Wales, Australia. The town is 478 kilometres (297 mi) south of the state capital Sydney and is the most southerly town in New South Wales, located between Nullica Bay to the south and Calle Calle Bay, the northern reach of Twofold Bay, and built on undulating land adjacent to the third-deepest natural harbour in the southern hemisphere, and Snug Cove on its western boundary. At the 2021 census, Eden had a population of 3,425.

The eastern coastline has rugged cliffs at the southern end and a wide, sandy surf beach, Aslings Beach, north of the cliffs. The beach ends at the entrance to Lake Curalo, a safe boating inlet of Twofold Bay. Although the urban settlement of Eden commenced in 1843 the settlement was not officially proclaimed as a township until 20 March 1885. The town's main industries include fishing, forestry, and tourism.

== History ==
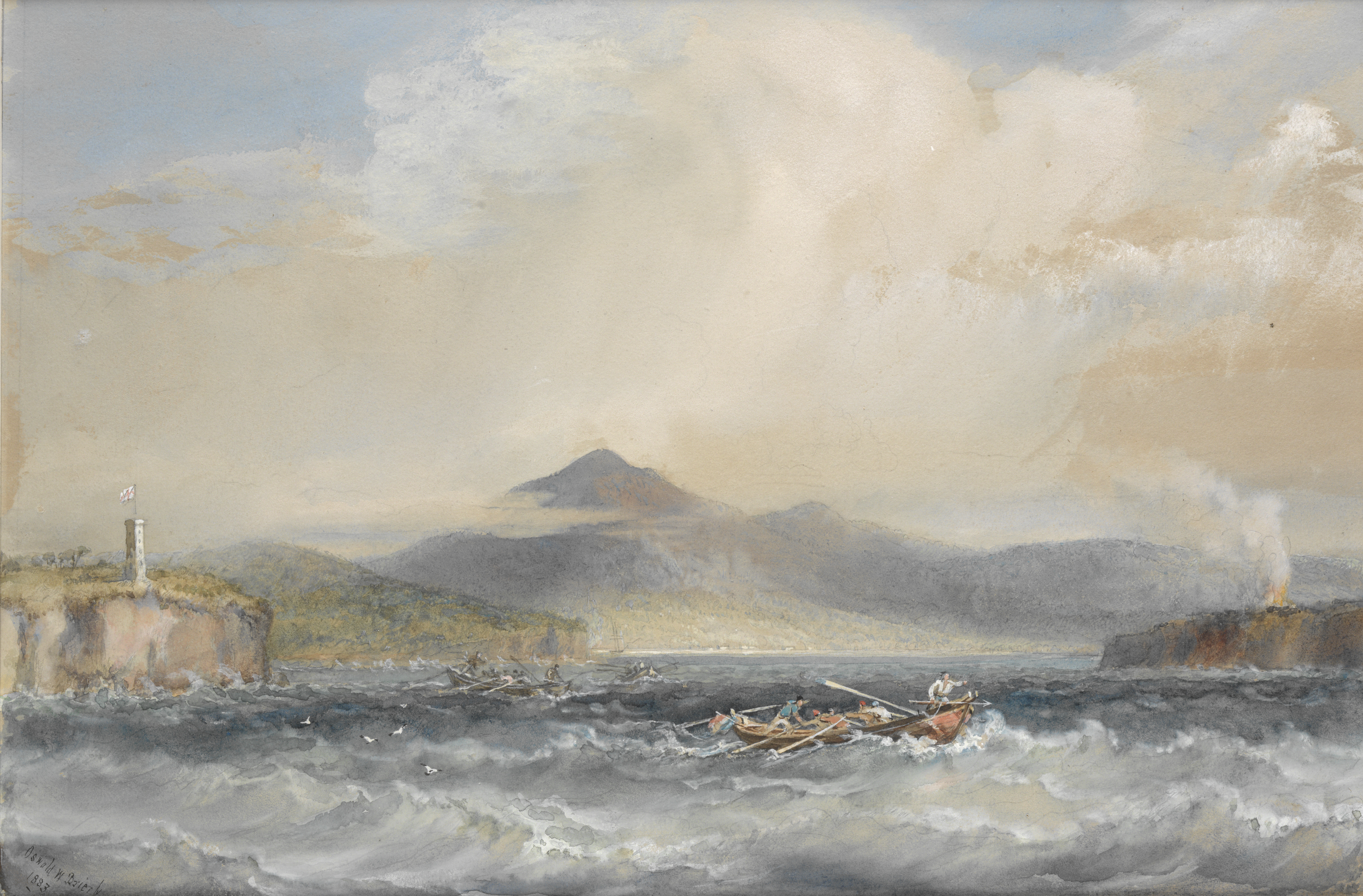
Whales in Sight, Twofold Bay, New South Wales, 1844, (State Library of New South Wales)

The local Aboriginal people who lived in the region prior to the arrival of Europeans were the Thaua, or Thawa, people of the Yuin nation.

Whaling ships had been operating in the area in 1791. George Bass first took shelter in Twofold Bay on the return leg of a voyage to Van Diemen's Land (Tasmania) in February 1798, having noted the bay on the southward leg of this same voyage in December 1797. Later, in September of that year, on a subsequent voyage with Matthew Flinders, he and Flinders surveyed the bay for the first time. They also made first contact with the local Thawa Aboriginal people on this occasion.

The Australian botanist, Allan Cunningham, landed at Snug Cove in December 1817 so that he could collect botanical specimens from the district.

The first whaling station, for shore whaling, was established in the area by John Raine in 1828. Local Aboriginal people were employed in the whaling industry. In 1834 the Imlay brothers, Alexander, George and Peter, set up a whaling station at Snug Cove. Nearby they built a small slab and bark hut, the first-known building erected at Eden. Sketches of the hut were made by Sir Oswald Brierly in 1842 and by Captain Owen Stanley from HMS Rattlesnake in 1843. In around 1860 Davidson commenced a partnership with the Solomon family of Eden-Monaro. Initially the prevalent orcas were seen by the partnership as a nuisance. But the Yuin aboriginals employed on the boat crews refused to kill orcas, and a new policy encouraged collaboration between whalers and the killer whales; the killer whales would trap humpback whales that entered Twofold Bay, the whales would then be harpooned, and the orcas rewarded with prize pieces of the humpback carcasses.

The graziers from the Monaro district inland from Twofold Bay were seeking a better way to transport their cattle to Hobart, Tasmania. It was decided to establish cattle-handling facilities and an accompanying township on an appropriate site on Twofold Bay. Thus, in 1834, the Home Government authorised the captain of HMS Alligator to seek an appropriate site for a settlement on Twofold Bay. Early in 1835 the Governor of New South Wales, Governor Richard Bourke, visited Twofold Bay and the site of the proposed new settlement on board HMS Hyacinth.

Eventually the area for the proposed town, to be called Eden, was surveyed in 1842 by Mr Thomas Townsend, the Government Surveyor. The main street, Imlay Street, was named after the Imlay brothers who were early pioneers to the district. Other streets were named after Lieutenant Flinders, George Bass, Queen Victoria and her consort, Prince Albert. A wharf was built out into a cove, now named Cattle Bay, from a site on the western edge of Eden, where cattle could be grazed prior to their being loaded onto the ships. Cattle were also grazed on Lookout Point until 1853, then this land was subdivided for housing.

Eden was named after George Eden, 1st Earl of Auckland, the British Secretary for the Colonies, Baron Auckland, whose family name was Eden. After the town plan was finalised the first blocks were auctioned on 9 March 1843. The land was sold to Thomas Aspinall, Benjamin Boyd, S. Clinton, Lewes Gordon, W. Hirst, James Kirwan, J.P. Robinson and T.A. Townsend.

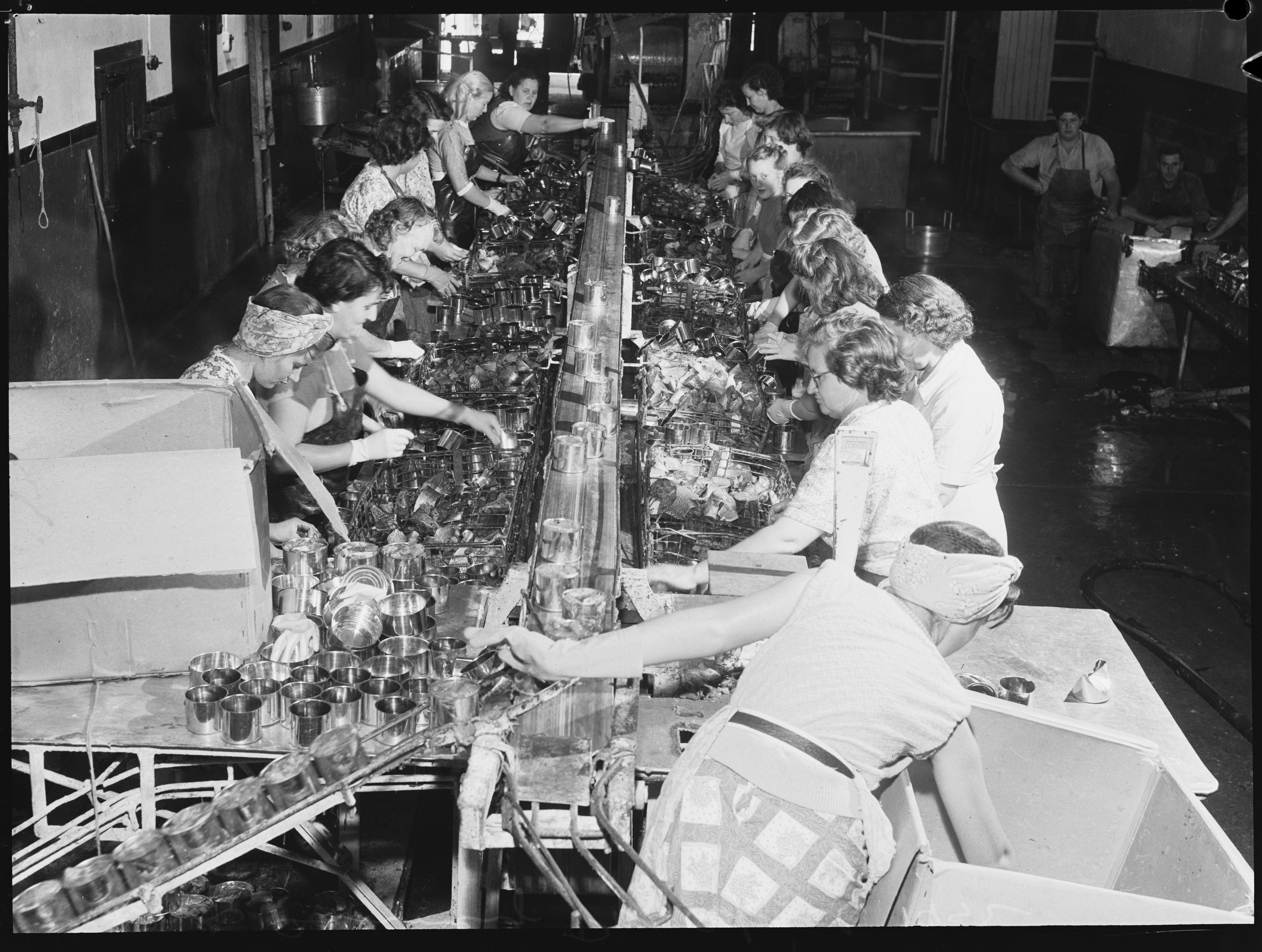
Women working in a fish cannery, Eden, New South Wales, April 1952

The first postmaster was appointed in 1843 but the first post office did not open until 1847. The Customs House was built in Eden in 1848. Earlier the first customs officer was appointed in 1846 but he was located at East Boyd initially, until the customs house was constructed.

Eden grew in the 1850s following the decline of nearby Boydtown, and the discovery of gold in Kiandra, which led to the 1859–1860 gold rush. For a few hectic months hundreds of gold seekers landed at Eden, replenished their supplies then headed for Kiandra. With the winter snow falls at Kiandra came the hurried exodus of those same people keen to leave the district as soon as possible. For a short period Eden flourished, only to quickly return to its usual quiet pace again.

In the 1850s there were four hotels in Eden. One of these hotels, the Crown and Anchor first licensed in 1845, still stands. It is no longer licensed but it still provides accommodation to travellers. Just south of this building is another built in 1850 as a commercial premises. Various businesses occupied the site. The building is now used as a private dwelling. The first government school started in 1857. The school attached to St Joseph's Roman Catholic church commenced in 1888. There were also several private tutors in Eden.

The shipping of cattle from Eden ceased in the late 1890s. Prior to that the business had expanded to include the shipping of cattle to South Australia, Queensland and to New Zealand.

Because Eden is equidistant between Sydney and both Melbourne and Tasmania, the port town was considered as a location for the Australian capital following Australian Federation in 1901. However, the ‘Limestone Plains’ in southern New South Wales were chosen instead as the location of the new city of Canberra.

Whaling declined in the 1920s and ended in 1930.

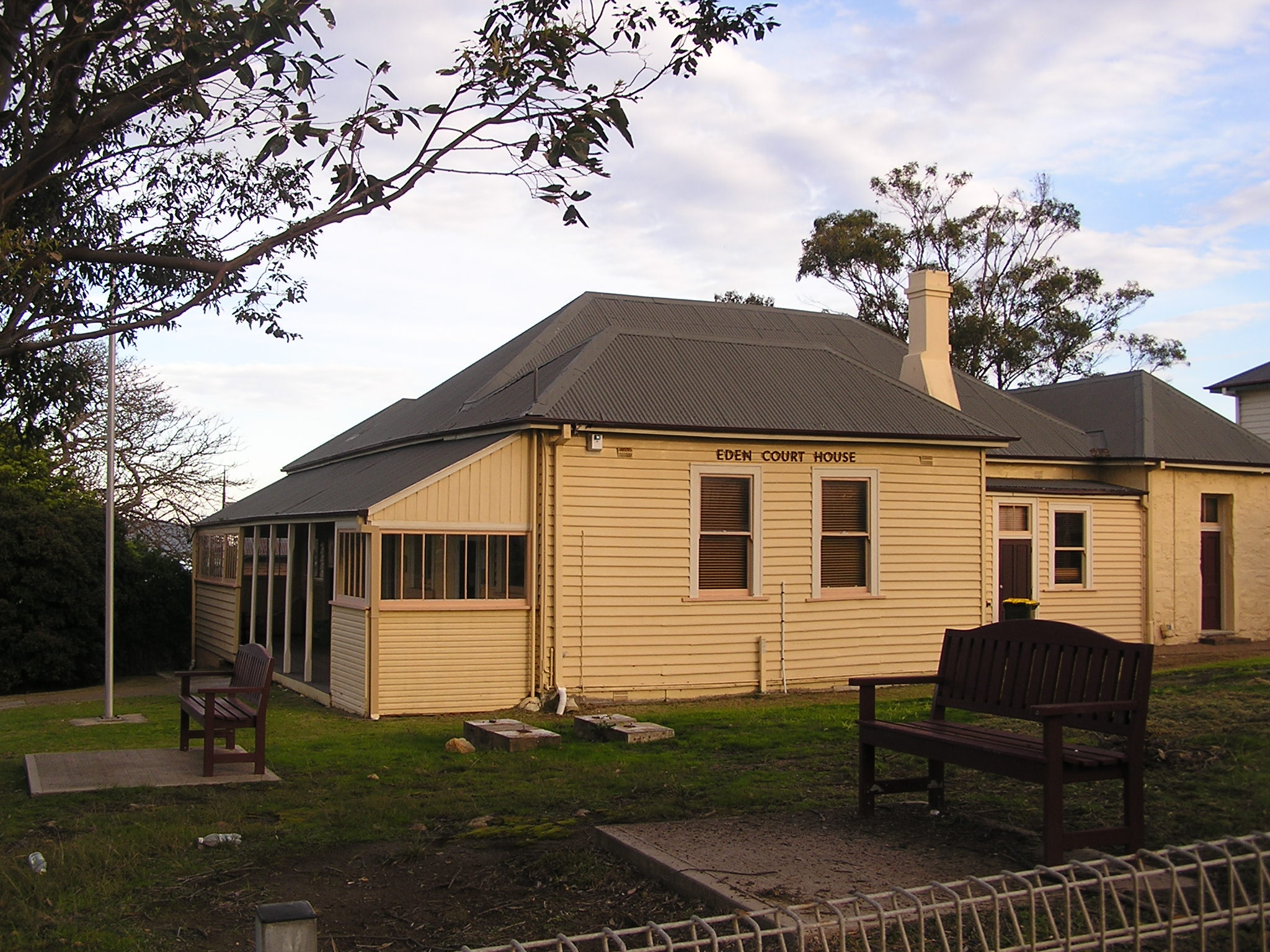
Court house built under the Colonial Architect, Alexander Dawson in 1858

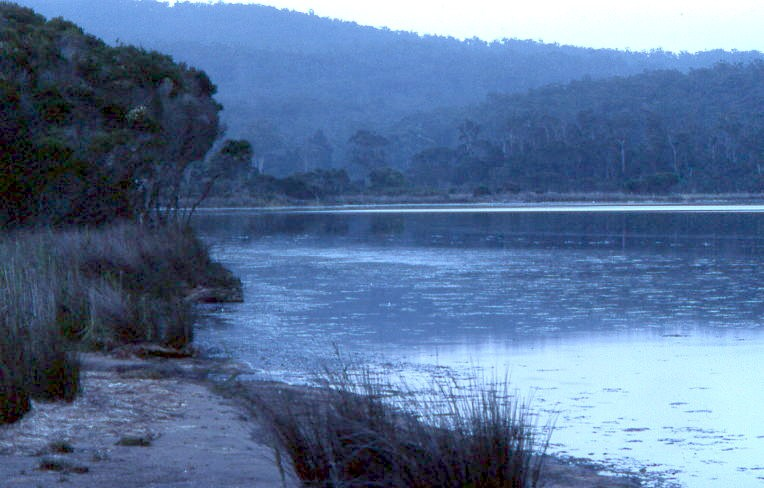
Lake Curalo at dusk

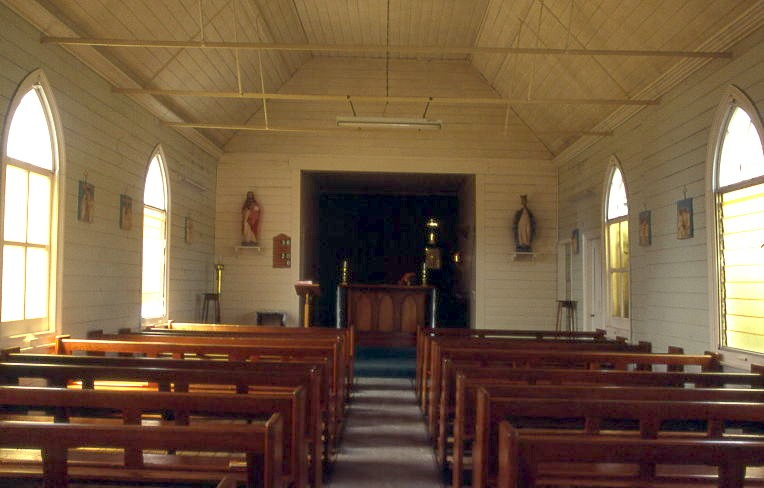
Catholic Church

== Population ==
According to the 2021 census of Population, there were 3,425 people in Eden.

- Aboriginal and Torres Strait Islander people made up 8.0% of the population.
- 78.6% of people were born in Australia and 87.5% of people spoke only English at home.
- The most common responses for religion were No Religion 43.2%, Anglican 18.1% and Catholic 17.6%.

== Local radio ==
2SEA FM (Eden Community Radio) broadcasts along the Sapphire Coast of New South Wales, Australia, servicing the towns of Eden, Pambula and Merimbula as well as the surrounding districts. 2SEA FM is a not-for-profit community radio station that relies on volunteers to provide programming, and sponsors for the finance to be able to go to air.

== Government ==
From its inception Eden was located in the County of Auckland, named earlier after the Earl of Auckland from whom Eden also took its name. However, the County of Auckland was not considered to be within the bounds of the Colony of New South Wales until many years after the settlement of Eden commenced.

The town of Eden lies within the Bega Valley Shire local government area. It is within the federal electorate of Eden-Monaro, which has for a long time been a key marginal seat, resulting in significant focus by the media and political parties during election campaigns. It is represented in the New South Wales Legislative Assembly by the electorate of Bega.

== Industry ==
Horse-racing commenced in Eden in the mid-1850s and continued until the mid-1920s. The racecourse was located on the northern bank of Lake Curalo.

A number of industries were based in the town in the mid-2000s. These are mainly related to the tourist industry and include a wide variety of accommodation, places to eat and entertainment, especially fishing and sailing. As well, cruises of Twofold Bay and for whale-watching leave the Eden Wharf located in Snug Cove. The cruise of Nullica Bay, Twofold Bay, allows close views of the two major wharves mentioned in the article on Twofold Bay.

Tourism contributes AU$180 million yearly to the economy of the shire, which includes Bega and several other towns. The area receives 550,000 visitors annually. Many people visit Eden for whale watching as whales migrate from Antarctic to tropical waters in June and July, and back again later in the year.

A significant fishing fleet is based in the harbour (Snug Cove). A tuna cannery opened in the town in 1949. It was closed in 1999, at the cost of many jobs. Sawmilling of timber has also been an important local industry for most of the life of the town. For over one hundred years the collection and export of wattle-bark was also a major local industry.

Whaling played a very important role in the town's economy for over 100 years before its decline in the area in the 1920s and its end in 1930. The Eden Killer Whale Museum informs visitors of the history of whaling in the area and the role of orcas (killer whales) led by Old Tom in herding whales into the harbour and helping whalers kill them. The whalers rewarded the orcas by allowing them to eat the lips and tongues of the dead whales.

== Port of Eden ==
The Port of Eden is one of two regional ports in New South Wales administered by the New South Wales Maritime Authority, the other is at Yamba on the North Coast. The Port of Eden is the largest fishing port in New South Wales. The major export handled by the port is woodchips. The port is shared with the Department of Defence who have constructed a large wharf for the servicing of their warships. The port also handles cruise ships.

From the 1850s to 1950s the port was serviced by the Illawarra Steam Navigation Company.

In 2021 the Port of Eden became the ceremonial home port for Royal Australian Navy auxiliary ship HMAS Supply (A195) the crew of which have adopted the killer whales of Eden as the official mascot.

In February 2025, the Ovation of the Seas docked at Eden, making it the largest ship to ever dock there.

== Notable people ==
- Grace Cuthbert-Browne, doctor
- Liz Cambage (born 1991), basketball player in the Israeli Female Basketball Premier League
- Brett Kelly, rugby league player
- Peter Kelly, rugby league player
- Mary Braidwood Mowle, diarist
- Corey Stewart, rugby league player

== See also ==
- Old Tom – The leader of a pack of killer whales who helped whalers in the port of Eden to capture baleen whales in return for the whales lips and tongues as food. Old Tom's skeleton is on display in the Eden Killer Whale Museum, and it is the only complete killer whale skeleton on display in the Southern Hemisphere.
- Woodchipping
- The local rugby league team, the Eden Tigers, compete in the Group 16 Rugby League competition.
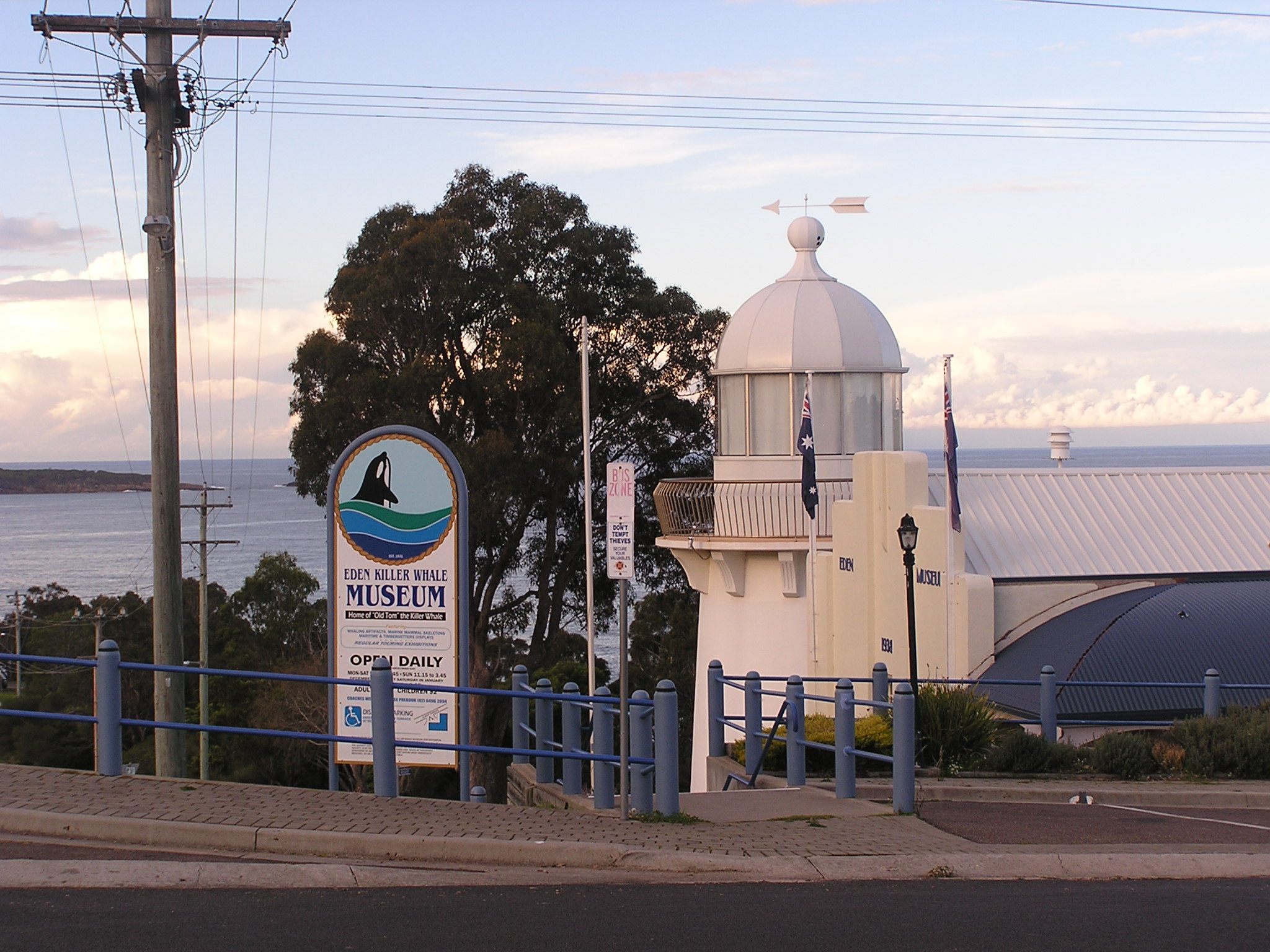
Killer whale museum

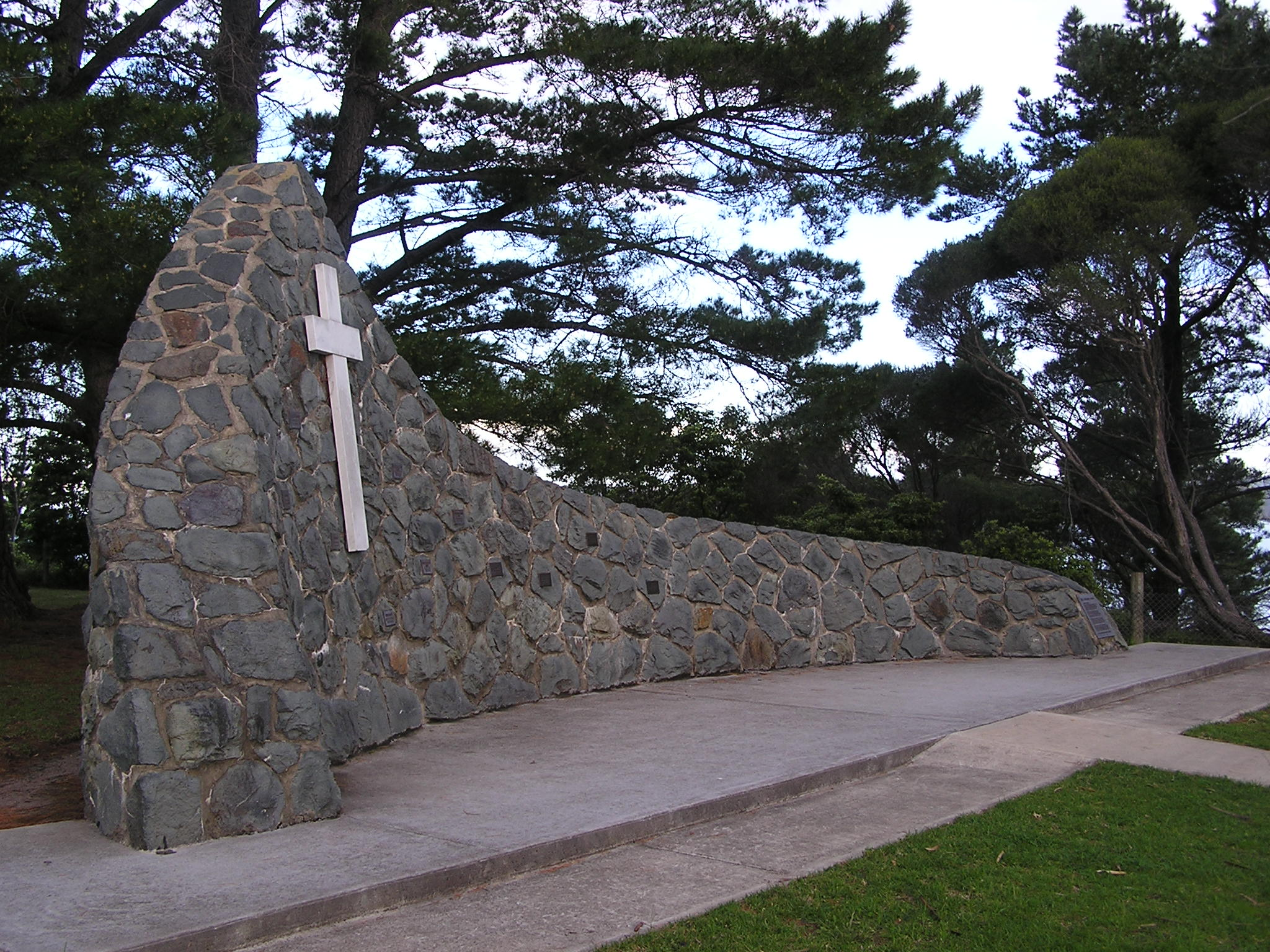
Memorial to all seamen from Eden lost at sea. Erected following the loss of the fishing trawler Shiralee in 1978 with the loss of all three men on board.

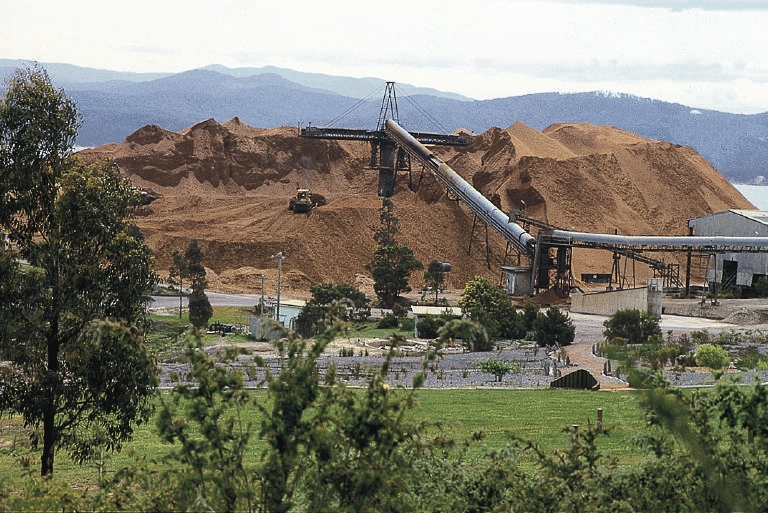
Woodchips awaiting export to Japan from the Allied Natural Wood Exports mill at Eden

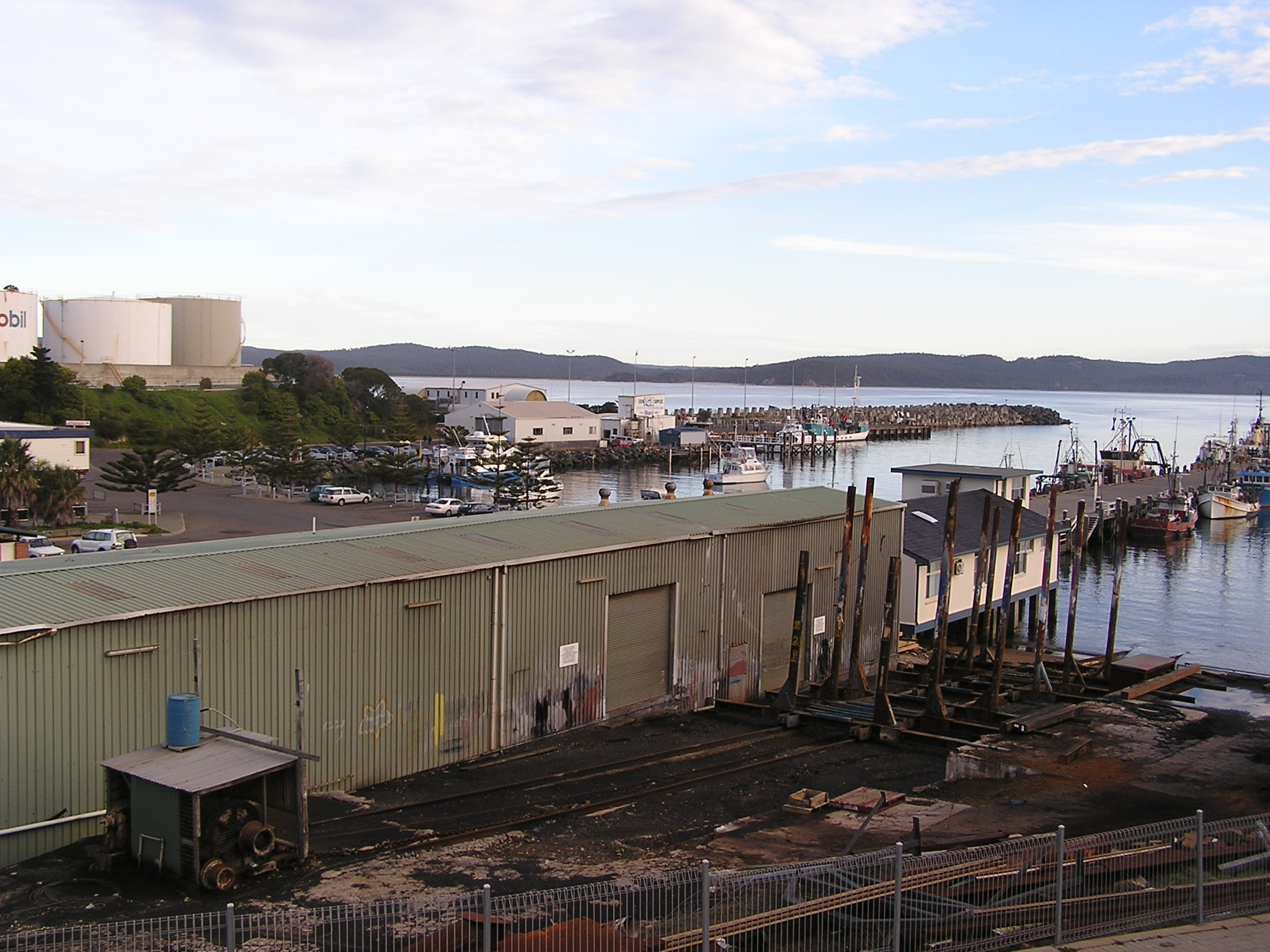
Port of Eden

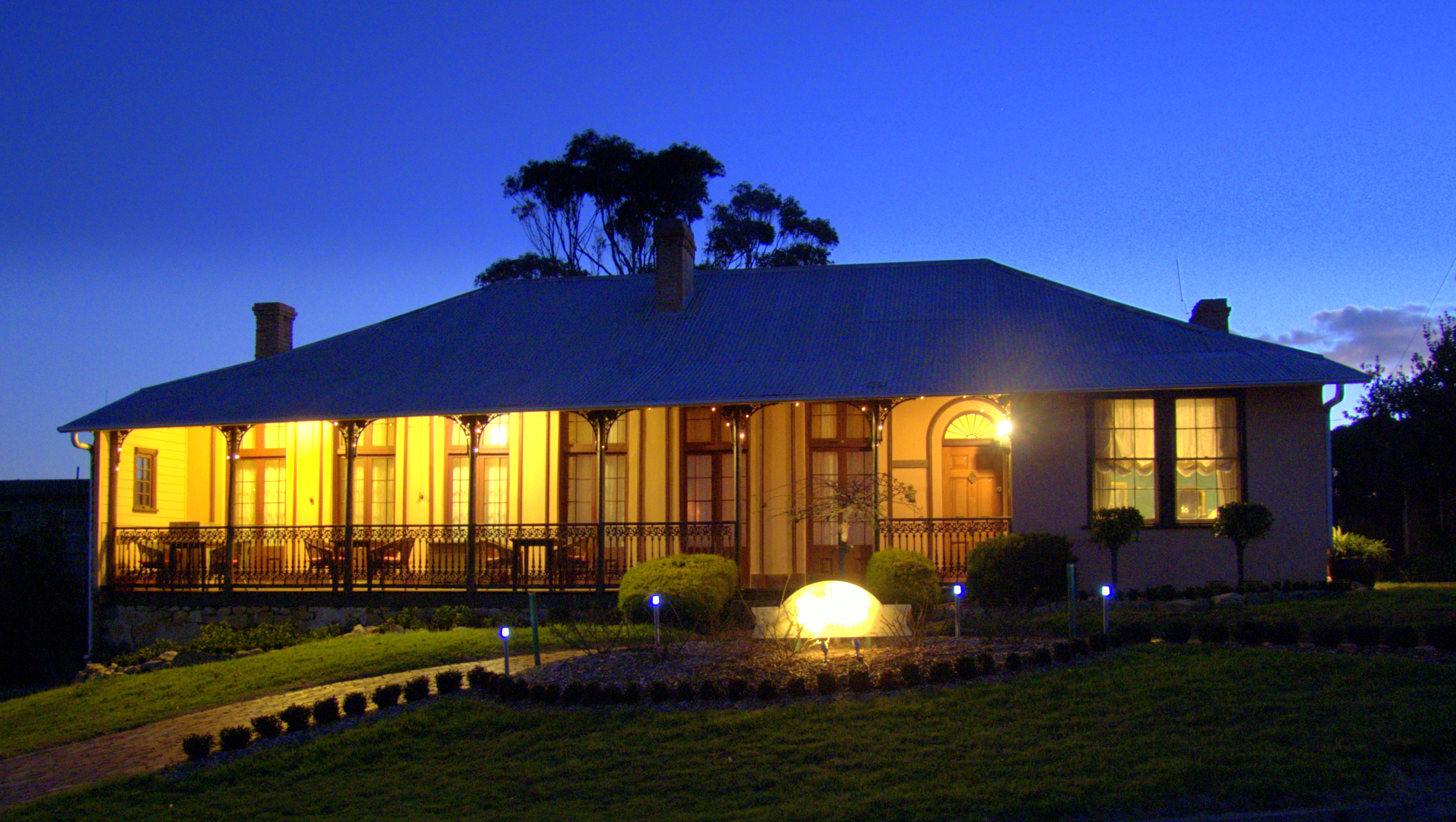
Crown & Anchor Inn – first licensed in 1845
