= Twofold Bay =

Bay in New South Wales, Australia

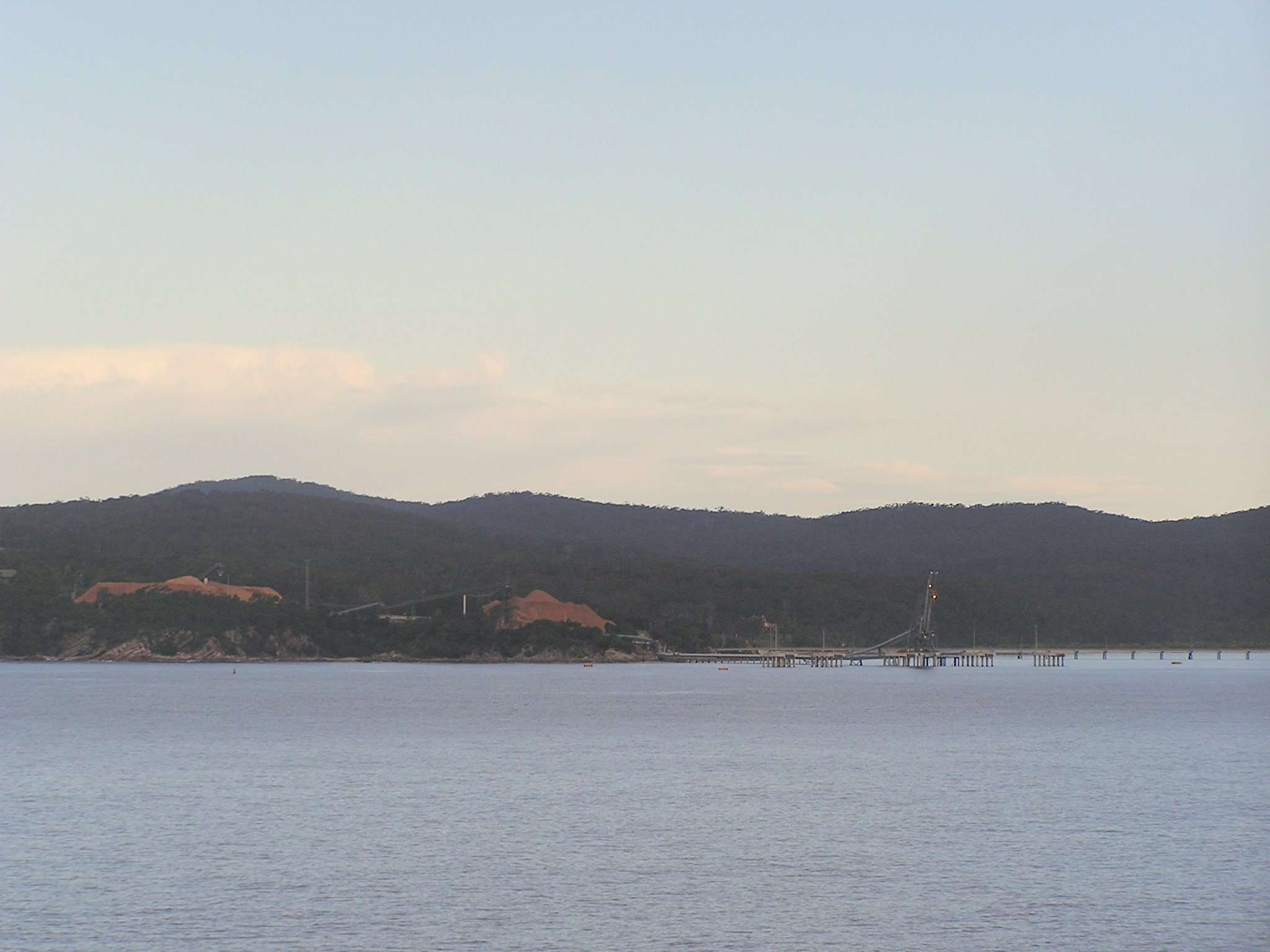
- Looking from Eden across Twofold Bay to wood chip supplies.

- Location of Twofold Bay in New South Wales
- Location: South Coast, New South Wales
- Coordinates: 37°03′55″S 149°54′04″E
- Type: An open oceanic embayment
- Primary inflows: Towamba River, Nullica River
- Primary outflows: Tasman Sea, South Pacific Ocean
- Catchment area: 11 km^{2} (4.2 sq mi)
- Basin countries: Australia
- Surface area: 30.7 km^{2} (11.9 sq mi)
- Average depth: 10.9 m (36 ft)
- Water volume: 334,559 megalitres (11,814.8×10^{6} cu ft)
- Frozen: never
- Settlements: Eden
- Website: NSW Environment & Heritage

Twofold Bay is an open oceanic embayment that is located in the South Coast region of New South Wales, Australia.

The bay was named by George Bass, for its shape of two bights. The northern bight is called Calle Calle Bay; while the southern bight is known as Nullica Bay, derived from Nalluccer, the original Aboriginal name for Twofold Bay.

The bay is also known for the "Killers of Eden", the killer whales that helped a group of whalers in their search for other whales. The best-known of these was Old Tom, whose skeleton is preserved in Eden's local museum.

== Location and features ==
Located near the town of Eden, Twofold Bay is approximately 40 kilometres (25 mi) to the north of the border between Victoria and New South Wales. The bay is fed from the Nullica River and Towamba River that both flow into Nullica Bay.

The catchment area of the bay is 11 square kilometres (4.2 sq mi) with a volume of 334,559 megalitres (11,814.8×10^{6} cu ft) over a surface area of 30.7 square kilometres (11.9 sq mi), at an average depth of 10.9 metres (36 ft); making the bay reputedly the third deepest natural harbour in the Southern Hemisphere.

Close to North Head is a conspicuous islet, Mewstone Rock. About 5 kilometres (3.1 mi) south of the islet is Red Point which forms the southern headland of the bay. Eden and the Port of Eden are located in the bay. The historical town of Boydtown is located to the west of the bay, located on Boydtown Beach which stretches south from the mouth of the Nullica River.

Local waters including Twofold Bay are recognised as one of twelve coastal aggregation areas for southern right whales in Australia.

== History ==
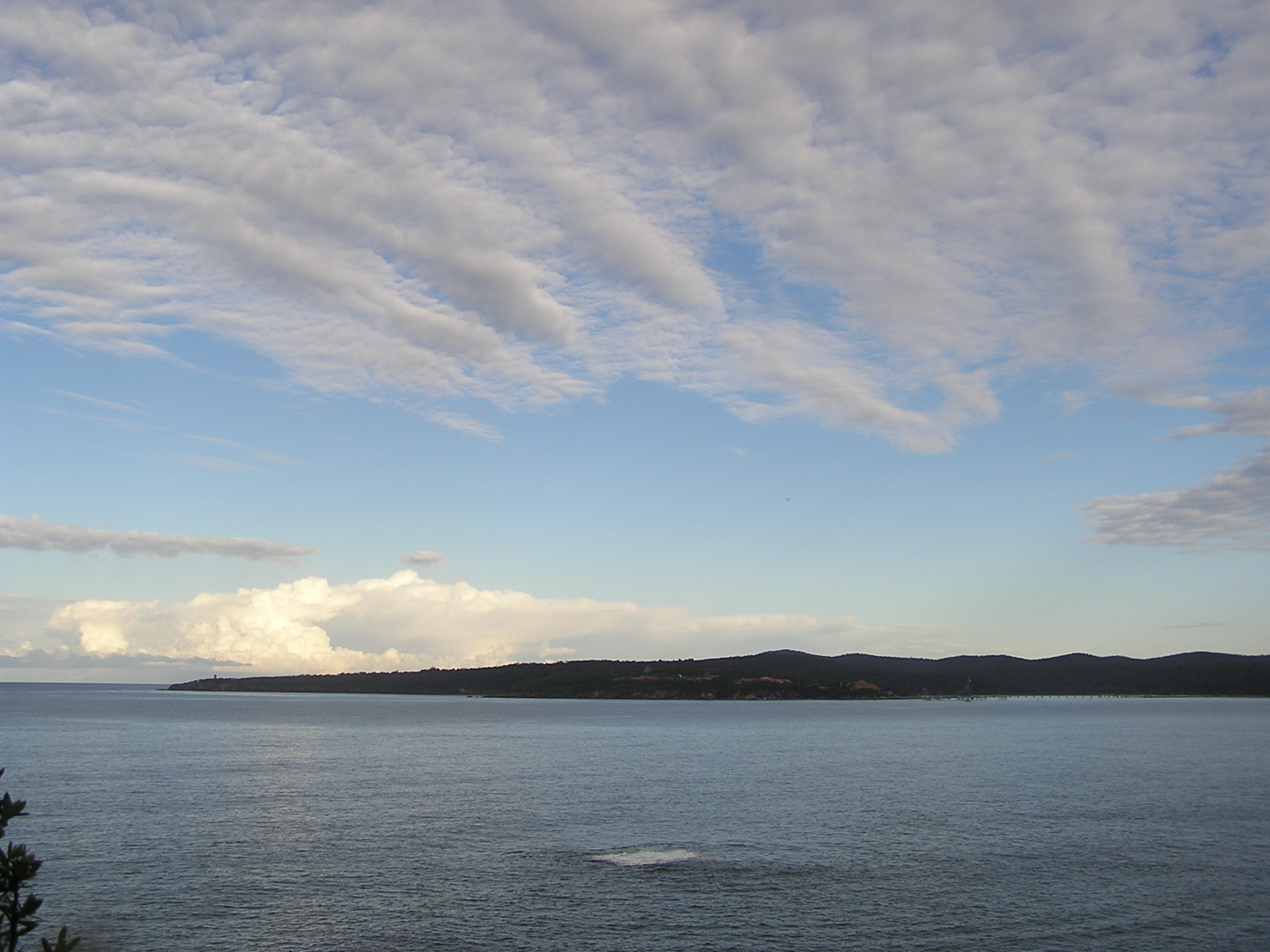
A view of the bay from Eden.

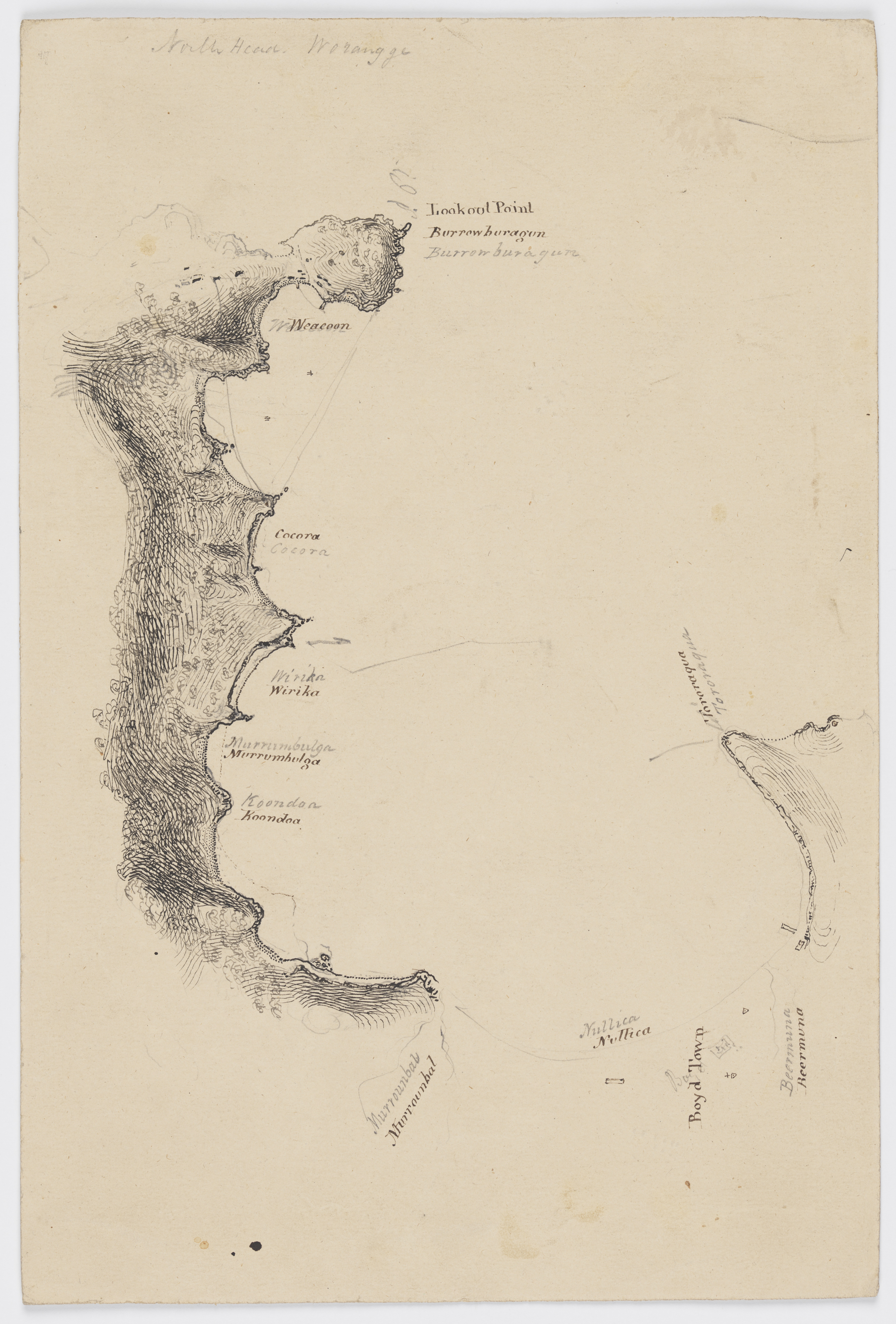
Sketch of Twofold Bay, New South Wales, 1842-43, (State Library of New South Wales)

=== Indigenous history ===
The original inhabitants of the area surrounding Twofold Bay were First Nations People of the Thaua or Nalbker clan of the Yuin nation.

=== European history ===
The first recorded visit to the bay by a European was by George Bass. The diaries of Bass show that he noted the bay when he passed it on his whaleboat voyage to Bass Strait in 1797/8. Bass took shelter in the bay on the return journey in February 1798; and named the place where he sheltered "Snug Cove", a name by which the bay is still known.

On 7 October 1798 Bass and Matthew Flinders set out from Port Jackson in the Norfolk on a voyage to determine whether or not Van Diemen's Land (now called Tasmania) was attached to the mainland of Australia. Accompanying them on this voyage was the Nautilus. Two days later a survey of Twofold Bay was commenced. This very accurate survey has required little subsequent modification apart from the addition of water depths and of shore-to-shore distances between important landmarks. Bass and Flinders also made their first contact with the local Thaua people.

The bay is mentioned in the logs of many ships which sheltered in it from the storms battering that part of the New South Wales coastline. Some of these ships were shipwrecked in the bay including the George (1805) and the Mary (1821).

Quarantine Bay, located 3 kilometres (1.9 mi) south of Eden, is so named because a sailing ship with a smallpox epidemic amongst the people on board took refuge in this (then) isolated area. Many people died and were buried on shore in a communal grave.

In 1843 Benjamin Boyd purchased land in Twofold Bay with the aim of transporting cattle from the district. Soon afterwards, Boyd started to build the Seahorse Inn adjacent to what is now called Boydtown Beach. Boydtown Beach lies on the western shore of Twofold Bay just south of the entrance to the Nullica River, which is located at the southern end of Quarantine Bay. The Seahorse Inn is still used for tourist accommodation. Nearby are the ruins of the church which Ben Boyd had constructed. Boyd conducted pastoral, whaling and shipping activities at Boydtown.

== In popular culture ==
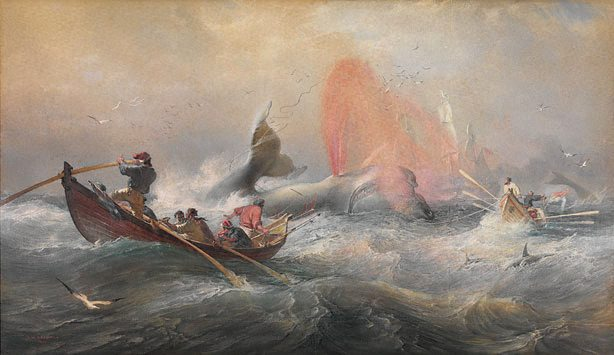
Sir Oswald Brierly, Whalers off Twofold Bay, New South Wales (1867) (Art Gallery of New South Wales)

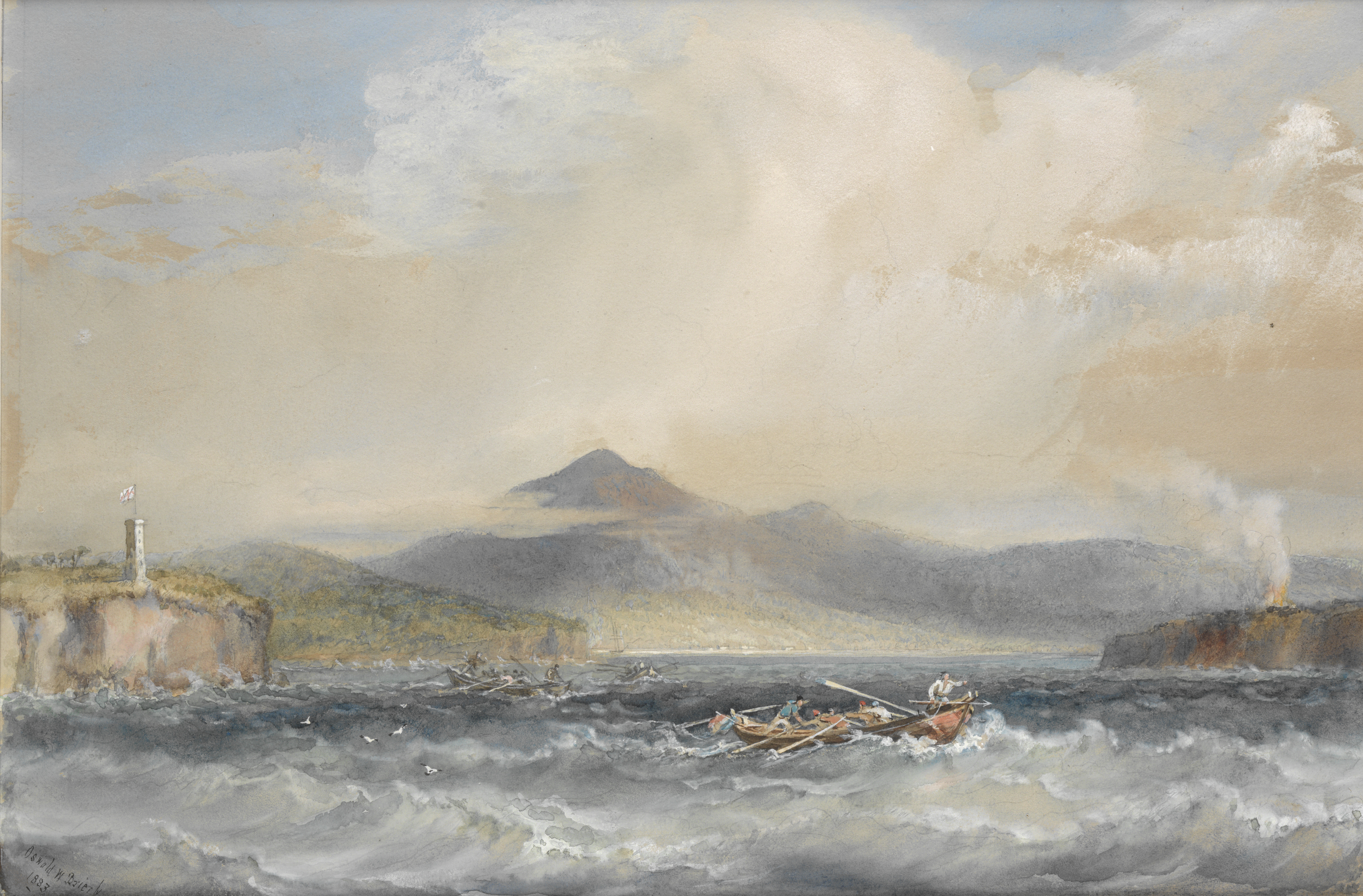
Whales in Sight, Twofold Bay, New South Wales, 1844, (State Library of New South Wales)

Artist Oswald Brierly managed a bay whaling operation at Boyd Town in the 1840s and while there he did a number of paintings and sketches of the bay. He did a few more paintings of the area after his return to Britain.

Evening: A scene in Boyd Town, Twofold Bay, is the title of a poem by Thomas Fennell, RN, that appeared in a New South Wales literary journal in 1847. Twofold Bay is the name, and subject, of a poem by E.J. Brady. Ben Boyd’s Tower, is the title of a poem by Henry Lawson.

Will Lawson's book In Ben Boyd's day (1939) is set in the bay. So too is Shirley Barrett's novel Rush Oh! (2015) which offers a fictionalised account of the family of whaler George Davidson at Eden.

The history of whaling in the bay, and the role Killer Whales in that process, is the focus of the Eden Killer Whale Museum.

The Twofold Bay is mentioned in “The Children Of Captain Grant” by Jules Verne.

== Industry ==
In the mid-2000s two major wharves dominate the south-eastern section of the bay.

The most easterly wharf services the woodchip mill. Usually two ships per month use the wharf. The forestry industry plays a significant role in the region. The Eden woodchip mill is owned by Pentarch, an Australian company which employs 600 people.

The second wharf belongs to the Department of Defence and is used by the Royal Australian Navy to service its ships. Parallel to the woodchip mill is a naval munitions storage depot. It is a multi-purpose wharf which allows other vessels, including cruise ships, to also moor at the wharf when the Naval ships are not using it.

Mussel farming occupies the westerly part of the bay off the small peninsula between Cattle Bay and Quarantine Bay.

== See also ==
- Coast to Kosciuszko, an ultramarathon race.
